= List of colleges and universities in Minnesota =

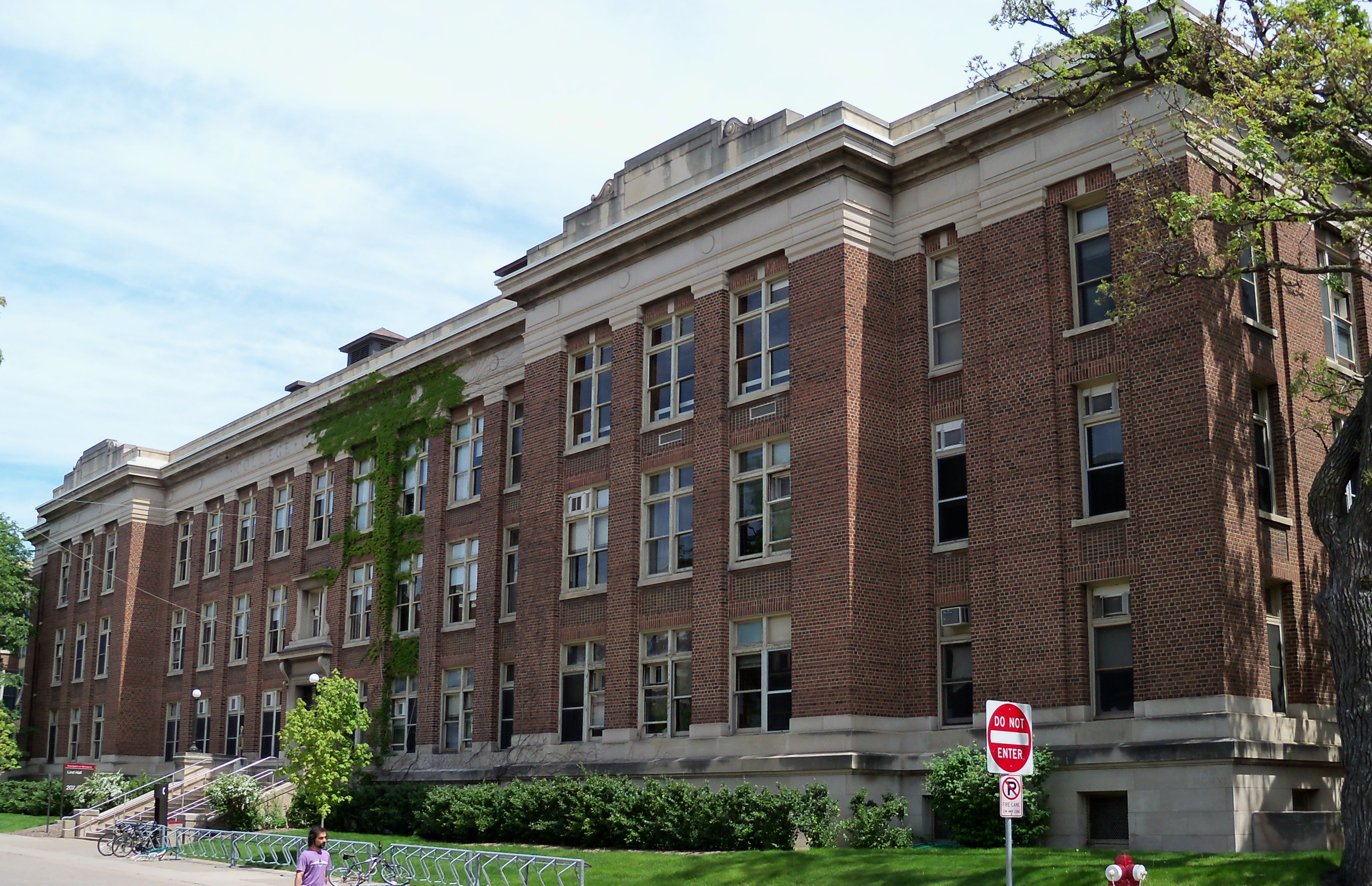
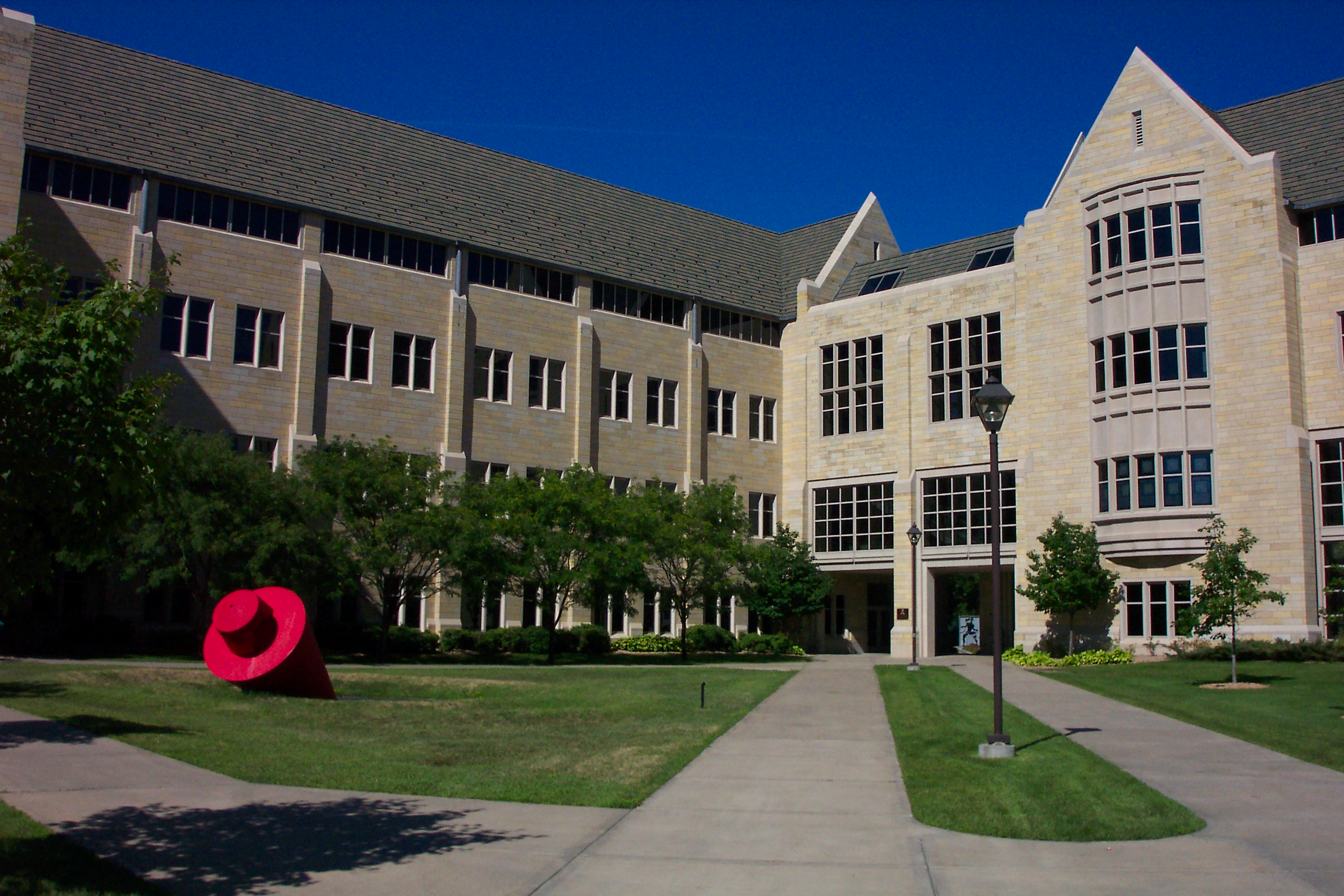
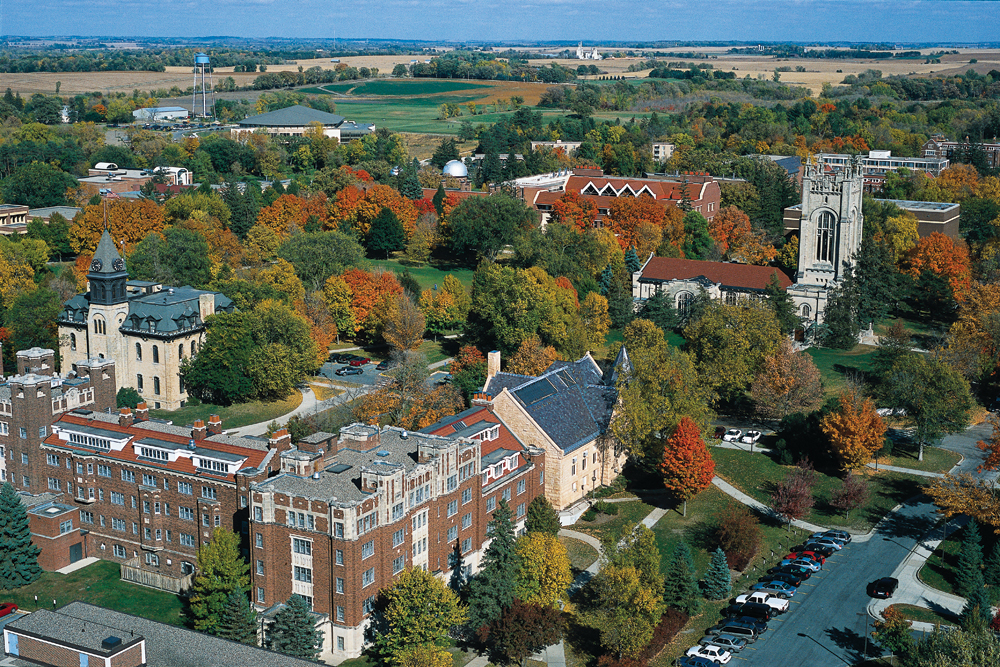
Lind Hall at the University of Minnesota (left), Frey Science and Engineering Hall at the University of St. Thomas (middle), and an aerial view of Carleton College (right)

There are nearly 110 post-secondary institutions in the U.S. state of Minnesota. The Twin Cities campus of the public University of Minnesota is the largest university in the state with 54,890 enrolled at the start of the 2023–24 academic year, making it the ninth-largest American campus by enrollment size. The University of Minnesota system has four other campuses in Crookston, Duluth, Morris, and Rochester. The Minnesota State Colleges and Universities system comprises 26 colleges and 7 universities on 54 campuses. Minnesota State University in Mankato is referred to as the flagship of the Minnesota State system, and is the second-largest university in the state.

The University of St. Thomas in St. Paul is Minnesota's largest private university or college with a fall 2023 enrollment of 9,121 students. Mahnomen–based White Earth Tribal and Community College is the state's smallest postsecondary institution, while Normandale Community College in Bloomington is Minnesota's largest community and technical college.

The majority of Minnesota's post-secondary institutions are accredited by the Higher Learning Commission (HLC), but 22 have received accreditation from the Accrediting Council for Independent Colleges and Schools (ACICS). Most are accredited by multiple agencies, such as the Commission on Collegiate Nursing Education (CCNE), the National Council for Accreditation of Teacher Education (NCATE), the National League for Nursing (NLNAC), and the American Psychological Association (APA).

While the University of Minnesota was chartered by the state in 1851, it did not operate as a place of higher education for nearly two decades. St. Paul–based Hamline University is considered the state's oldest private college or university, being founded in 1854 as a Methodist coeducational institution. Mayo Medical School, the University of Minnesota, and University of Minnesota Duluth feature the only medical schools in the state. Mitchell Hamline School of Law, the University of Minnesota Law School, and the University of St. Thomas School of Law are American Bar Association-accredited law schools.

== Extant institutions ==
Institution	Location(s)	Control (Note: School control is based on the Carnegie Classification of Institutions of Higher Education.)	Type (Note: School types are based on the Carnegie Classification of Institutions of Higher Education.)	Enrollment (fall 2024)	Founded
Alexandria Technical and Community College	Alexandria	Public	Associate's college	3,281	1961
Anoka Technical College	Anoka	Public	Associate's college	1,970	1967
Anoka-Ramsey Community College	Coon Rapids, Cambridge	Public	Associate's college	8,486	1965
Bemidji State University	Bemidji	Public	Master's university	4,072	1919
Central Lakes College	Brainerd, Staples	Public	Associate's college	4,981	1938
Century College	White Bear Lake	Public	Associate's college	8,726	1967
Dakota County Technical College	Rosemount	Public	Associate's college	2,894	1970
Fond du Lac Tribal and Community College	Cloquet	Public	Tribal college	1,789	1987
Hennepin Technical College	Brooklyn Park, Eden Prairie	Public	Associate's college	4,572	1972
Inver Hills Community College	Inver Grove Heights	Public	Associate's college	3,804	1970
Lake Superior College	Duluth	Public	Associate's college	4,074	1995
Leech Lake Tribal College	Cass Lake	Public	Tribal college	209	1990
Metropolitan State University	St. Paul, Minneapolis	Public	Master's university	6,660	1971
Minneapolis College	Minneapolis	Public	Associate's college	6,733	1996
Minnesota North College	Hibbing, Ely, Eveleth, Grand Rapids, International Falls, Virginia	Public	Associate's college	3,174	1916
Minnesota State College Southeast	Winona, Red Wing	Public	Associate's college	2,331	1949
Minnesota State Community and Technical College	Fergus Falls, Detroit Lakes, Moorhead, Wadena	Public	Associate's college	5,645	1960
Minnesota State University, Mankato	Mankato	Public	Master's university	15,271	1868
Minnesota State University Moorhead	Moorhead	Public	Master's university	4,386	1885
Minnesota West Community and Technical College	Granite Falls, Canby, Jackson, Pipestone, Worthington	Public	Associate's college	3,695	1967
Normandale Community College	Bloomington	Public	Associate's college	11,026	1968
North Hennepin Community College	Brooklyn Park	Public	Associate's college	5,563	1966
Northland Community & Technical College	Thief River Falls, East Grand Forks	Public	Associate's college	2,631	1949
Northwest Technical College	Bemidji	Public	Associate's college	978	1965
Pine Technical and Community College	Pine City	Public	Associate's college	1,794	1965
Ridgewater College	Hutchinson, Willmar	Public	Associate's college	3,148	1996
Riverland Community College	Albert Lea, Austin, Owatonna	Public	Associate's college	3,959	1940
Rochester Community and Technical College	Rochester	Public	Associate's college	5,205	1915
St. Cloud State University	St. Cloud	Public	Master's university	10,732	1869
St. Cloud Technical and Community College	St. Cloud	Public	Associate's college	4,030	1948
Saint Paul College	St. Paul	Public	Associate's college	5,198	1910
South Central College	North Mankato, Faribault	Public	Associate's college	2,731	1946
Southwest Minnesota State University	Marshall	Public	Master's university	8,214	1963
University of Minnesota Crookston	Crookston	Public	Baccalaureate college	2,612	1966
University of Minnesota Duluth	Duluth	Public	Master's university	9,253	1947
University of Minnesota Morris	Morris	Public	Baccalaureate college	981	1960
University of Minnesota Rochester	Rochester	Public	Associate's college	578	1966
University of Minnesota, Twin Cities	Minneapolis, St. Paul	Public	Research university	56,666	1851
White Earth Tribal and Community College	Mahnomen	Public	Tribal college	119	1997
Winona State University	Winona, Rochester	Public	Master's university	6,045	1858
Academy College	Bloomington	Private not-for-profit	Special-focus institution	56	1936
Adler Graduate School	Minnetonka	Private not-for-profit	Special-focus institution	275	1967
Augsburg University	Minneapolis	Private not-for-profit (Lutheran)	Master's university	3,249	1869
Bethany Global University	Bloomington	Private not-for-profit (non-denominational Christian)	Special-focus institution	100	1948
Bethany Lutheran College	Mankato	Private not-for-profit (Lutheran)	Baccalaureate college	899	1927
Bethel University	Arden Hills	Private not-for-profit (Baptist)	Master's university	3,603	1871
Bethlehem College & Seminary	Minneapolis	Private not-for-profit	Special-focus institution	200	2009
Carleton College	Northfield	Private not-for-profit	Baccalaureate college	2,128	1866
College of Saint Benedict and Saint John's University	St. Joseph, Collegeville	Private not-for-profit (Roman Catholic)	Baccalaureate college	3,001 (CSB-SJU combined)	1857 (SJU) 1913 (CSB)
College of St. Scholastica	Duluth	Private not-for-profit (Roman Catholic)	Master's university	2,930	1912
Concordia College	Moorhead	Private not-for-profit (Lutheran)	Baccalaureate college	1,935	1891
Concordia University	St. Paul	Private not-for-profit (Lutheran)	Master's university	6,003	1893
Crown College	St. Bonifacius	Private not-for-profit (Christian and Missionary Alliance)	Baccalaureate college	1,846	1916
Dunwoody College of Technology	Minneapolis	Private not-for-profit	Associate's college	1,537	1914
Gustavus Adolphus College	St. Peter	Private not-for-profit (Lutheran)	Baccalaureate college	1,906	1862
Hamline University	St. Paul	Private not-for-profit (Methodist)	Master's university	2,565	1854
Hazelden Graduate School of Addiction Studies	Center City	Private not-for-profit	Special-focus institution	192	1999
Luther Seminary	St. Paul	Private not-for-profit (Lutheran)	Special-focus institution	371	1869
Macalester College	St. Paul	Private not-for-profit (Presbyterian)	Baccalaureate college	2,138	1874
Martin Luther College	New Ulm	Private not-for-profit (Lutheran)	Baccalaureate college	878	1995
Mayo Clinic College of Medicine and Science	Rochester	Private not-for-profit	Special-focus institution	1,439	1915
Minneapolis College of Art and Design	Minneapolis	Private not-for-profit	Special-focus institution	831	1886
Mitchell Hamline School of Law	St. Paul	Private not-for-profit	Special-focus institution	1,163	1900
North Central University	Minneapolis	Private not-for-profit (Assemblies of God)	Baccalaureate college	852	1930
Northwestern Health Sciences University	Bloomington	Private not-for-profit	Special-focus institution	1,101	1941
Oak Hills Christian College	Bemidji	Private not-for-profit (non-denominational Christian)	Special-focus institution	95	1946
St. Catherine University	St. Paul, Minneapolis	Private not-for-profit (Roman Catholic)	Master's university	3,651	1905
Saint Mary's University of Minnesota	Winona, Minneapolis	Private not-for-profit (Roman Catholic)	Master's university	4,505	1912
St. Olaf College	Northfield	Private not-for-profit (Lutheran)	Baccalaureate college	3,124	1874
United Theological Seminary of the Twin Cities	St. Paul	Private not-for-profit (United Church of Christ)	Special-focus institution	226	1960
University of Northwestern – St. Paul	Roseville	Private not-for-profit (non-denominational Christian)	Baccalaureate college	3,234	1902
University of St. Thomas	St. Paul, Minneapolis	Private not-for-profit (Roman Catholic)	Doctoral/research university	9,410	1885
American Academy of Health and Wellness	Roseville	Private for-profit	Special-focus institution	29	1997
Capella University	Minneapolis	Private for-profit	Doctoral/research university	47,761	1993
Rasmussen University	Bloomington, Brooklyn Park, Eagan, Mankato, Moorhead, St. Cloud	Private for-profit	Associate's college	9,416 (Note: Rasmussen College operates campuses in Brooklyn Park, Eagan, Eden Prairie, Lake Elmo, Mankato, and St. Cloud.)	1904
Walden University	Minneapolis	Private for-profit	Doctoral/research university	49,441	1970

== Defunct institutions ==
Institution	Location(s)	Control	Founded	Closed	Ref
Albert Lea College	Albert Lea	Private (Presbyterian)	1885	1973	
Argosy University	Eagan	Private for-profit	2001	2019	
College of Visual Arts	St. Paul	Private (not-for-profit)	1924	2013	
Duluth Business University	Duluth	Private for-profit	1891	2018	
Fairlakes State Junior College	Fairmont	Public	1973	1975	
Golden Valley Lutheran College	Golden Valley	Private (Lutheran)	1919	1985	
International Center for Naturobioholistic Health and Medicine	Bemidji	Private for-profit accredited ACICS	1978	1984	
Lea College	Albert Lea	Private	1965	1973	
Pillsbury Baptist Bible College	Owatonna	Private (Independent Baptist)	1957	2008	
College of Saint Teresa	Winona	Private (Roman Catholic)	1907	1989	
Southern Minnesota Normal College	Austin	Public	1897	1925	
Minnesota Central University	Hastings	Public	1857	1867	
University of Minnesota Waseca	Waseca	Public	1971	1992	
Brown College	Mendota Heights, Brooklyn Center	Private for-profit	1946	2015	
Crossroads College	Rochester	Private (Church of Christ)	1913	2016	
Globe University and Minnesota School of Business	multiple	Private for-profit	1877	2016	
McNally Smith College of Music	St. Paul	Private for-profit	1985	2017	
Minneapolis Business College	Roseville	Private for-profit	1874	2019	
CenterPoint Massage & Shiatsu School & Clinic	St. Louis Park	Private for-profit	2001	2021	
National for-profit institution National American University operated campuses in Bloomington, Brooklyn Center, Burnsville, Rochester and Roseville that offered associate's and bachelor's degrees.; National for-profit institution the University of Phoenix formerly operated a campus in St. Louis Park that offers bachelor's and master's degrees.

== Out-of-state institutions ==
- National for-profit institution Herzing University operates a campus in St. Louis Park that offers associate's, bachelor's, and master's degrees.

== Key ==
Abbreviation	Accrediting agency
AAMFT	American Association for Marriage and Family Therapy
AANA	American Association of Nurse Anesthetists
ABA	American Bar Association
ACICS	Accrediting Council for Independent Colleges and Schools
ACME	Accreditation Commission for Midwifery Education
ACPE	Accreditation Council for Pharmacy Education
ADA	American Dental Association
ADA	American Dietetic Association
AOTA	American Occupational Therapy Association
APA	American Psychological Association
APTA	American Physical Therapy Association
ASHA	American Speech–Language–Hearing Association
CCNE	Commission on Collegiate Nursing Education
JRCERT	Joint Review Committee on Education Programs in Radiologic Technology
LCME	Liaison Committee on Medical Education
MSCHE	Middle States Association of Colleges and Schools
NASAD	National Association of Schools of Art and Design
NASD	National Association of Schools of Dance
NASM	National Association of Schools of Music
NAST	National Association of Schools of Theatre
HLC	Higher Learning Commission
NCATE	National Council for Accreditation of Teacher Education
NLNAC	National League for Nursing

== See also ==
- List of college athletic programs in Minnesota
- Higher education in the United States
- List of American institutions of higher education

== Bibliography ==
- Jarchow, Merrill E. (1973). Private Liberal Arts Colleges in Minnesota: Their History and Contributions. Minnesota Historical Society. ISBN 0-87351-081-X.
- Colleges in the Midwest: Compare Colleges in Your Region, 24th edition. Lawrence Township, New Jersey: Peterson's. 2009. ISBN 978-0-7689-2690-3.
- Two-Year Colleges 2011, 41st edition. Lawrence Township, New Jersey: Peterson's. 2010. ISBN 978-0-7689-2835-8.
