= Wisconsin's 73rd Assembly district =

American legislative district in northwest Wisconsin

Wisconsin's 73rd State Assembly district
- 2024 map defined in 2023 Wisc. Act 94; 2022 map defined in Johnson v. Wisconsin Elections Commission; 2011 map was defined in 2011 Wisc. Act 43
Assemblymember
Angela Stroud; D–Gingles
since January 6, 2025 (1 years)
- Demographics: 86.08% White; 1.55% Black; 1.12% Hispanic; 1.0% Asian; 9.18% Native American; 0.12% Hawaiian/Pacific Islander
- Population (2020) • Voting age: 59,853; 48,115
- Website: Official website
- Notes: Northwest Wisconsin

The 73rd Assembly district of Wisconsin is one of 99 districts in the Wisconsin State Assembly. Located in the northwest corner of Wisconsin, the district comprises parts of northern Douglas County, northern Bayfield County, and northern Ashland County. It includes the cities of Superior, Ashland, Bayfield, and Washburn, and the villages of Oliver and Poplar. The district also contains the Bad River and Red Cliff Indian reservations, Apostle Islands National Lakeshore, Big Bay State Park, Pattison State Park, Amnicon Falls State Park, and the University of Wisconsin–Superior campus. The district is represented by Democratic Angela Stroud, since January 2025.

The 73rd Assembly district is located within Wisconsin's 25th Senate district, along with the 74th and 75th Assembly districts.

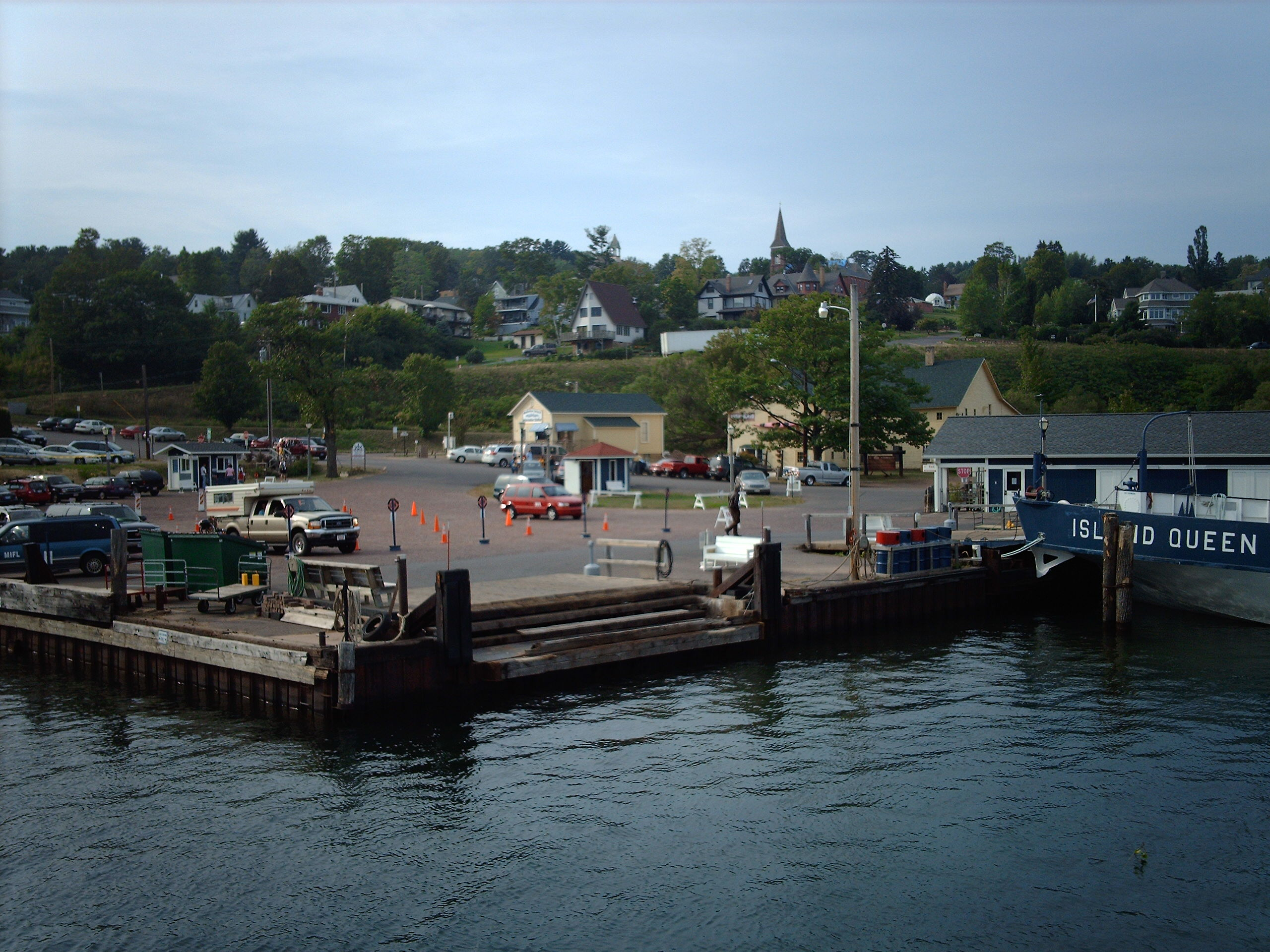
Harbor at Bayfield

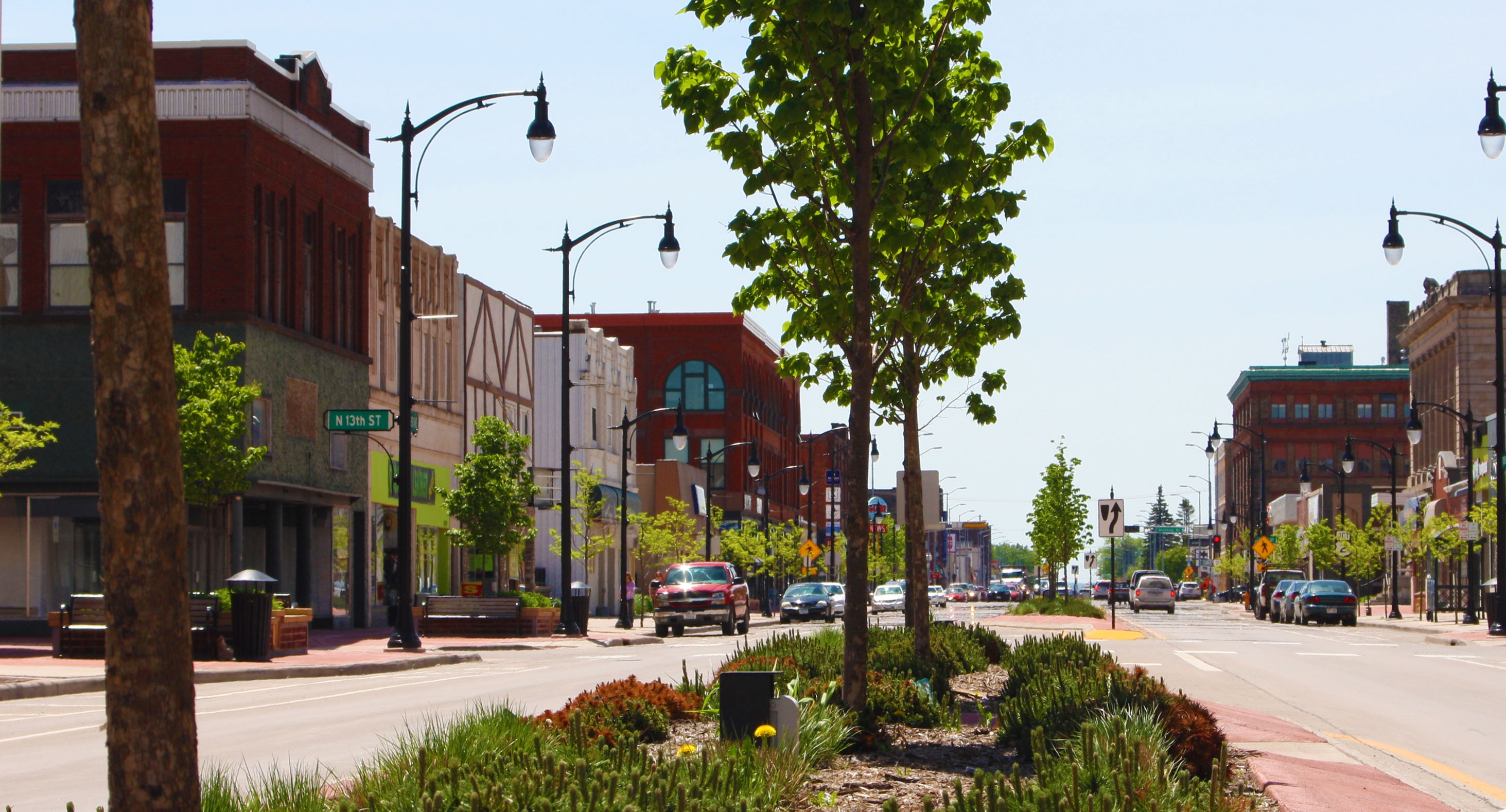
Tower Avenue in downtown Superior

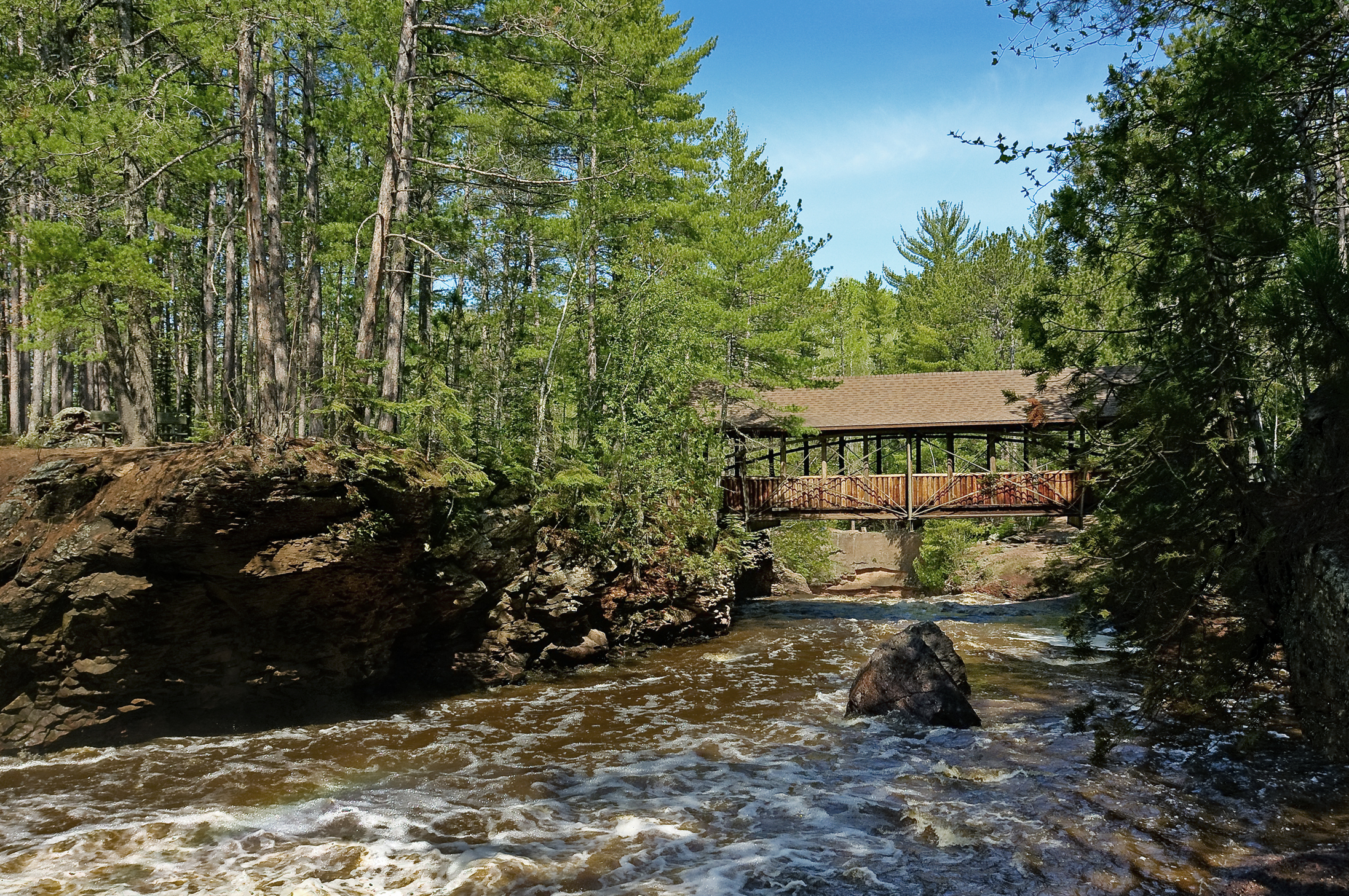
Amnicon Falls State Park

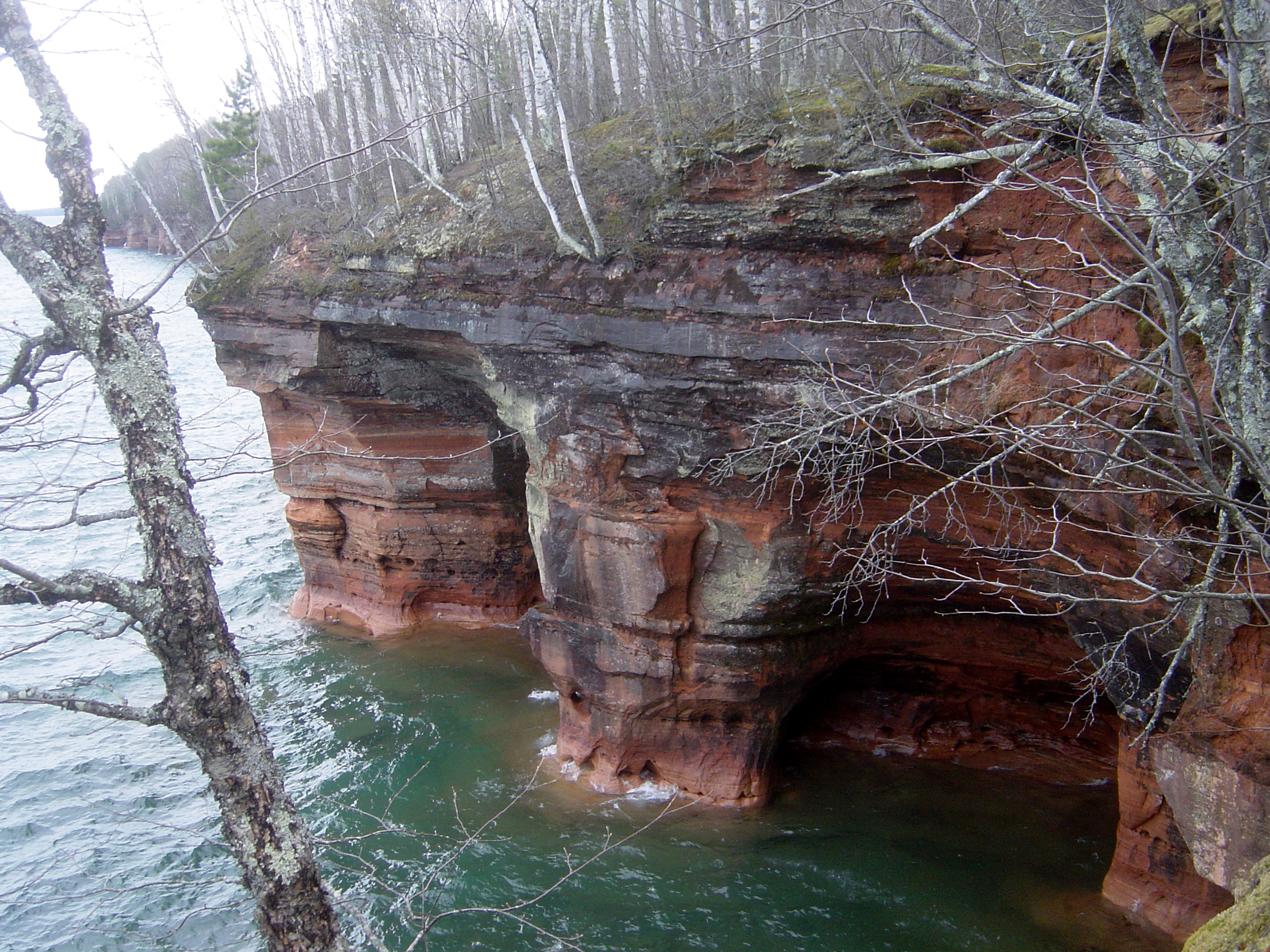
Mawikwe Bay Sea Caves in the Apostle Islands National Lakeshore

== List of past representatives ==
List of representatives to the Wisconsin State Assembly from the 73rd district
Member	Party	Residence	Counties represented	Term start	Term end	Ref.
District created
Thomas B. Murray	Dem.	Superior	Douglas	January 1, 1973	January 3, 1983	
Lary J. Swoboda	Dem.	Luxemburg	Brown, Door, Kewaunee	January 3, 1983	January 7, 1985	
Robert Jauch	Dem.	Superior	Douglas	January 7, 1985	January 5, 1987	
Frank Boyle	Dem.	Superior	Douglas	January 5, 1987	January 5, 2009	
Frank Boyle	Dem.	Superior	Burnett, Douglas, Washburn	January 5, 1987	January 5, 2009	
Nick Milroy	Dem.	South Range	Burnett, Douglas, Washburn	January 5, 2009	January 2, 2023	
Angie Sapik	Rep.	Lake Nebagamon	Burnett, Douglas, Washburn	January 3, 2023	January 6, 2025	
Angela Stroud	Dem.	Gingles	Ashland, Bayfield, Douglas	January 6, 2025	Current	
