= Garey Bies =

American politician

Garey D. Bies

Member of the Wisconsin State Assembly from the 1st district
- In office January 3, 2001 – January 3, 2015
- Preceded by: David E. Hutchison
- Succeeded by: Joel Kitchens

Personal details
- Born: October 26, 1946 (age 79) Manitowoc, Wisconsin, U.S.
- Party: Republican
- Children: 4
- Education: Northeast Wisconsin Technical College
- Profession: Former deputy sheriff
- Website: Official website

Garey Bies (born 1946) is a politician and former deputy sheriff from Sister Bay, Wisconsin who served as a Republican Party member of the Wisconsin State Assembly, representing the 1st Assembly District from 2001 to 2015. He served as a member of the committees on Natural Resources, Tourism, Recreation, and State Property; Transportation, Veterans and Military Affairs, and as the chair of the Committee on Corrections and Courts.

Bies was born in Manitowoc, graduated from Lincoln High School, and later earned an associate degree from Northeast Wisconsin Technical College. He served in the Navy for five years and worked in law enforcement for 30 years, retiring as chief deputy sheriff of Door County.

Bies was first elected to the Assembly in 2000, defeating the Democratic candidate, former State Representative Lary J. Swoboda with 16,132 votes to 12,104 for Swoboda. He was re-elected in each biennial election after that, through 2012.

Bies deplored what he describes as the one-sided lack of civility exhibited by Democrats during the 2011-2012 Assembly sessions. He voted for tax cuts for businesses to attract new businesses to Wisconsin and to encourage the expansion of existing businesses. He says that the purpose of government is to "lay the rules down to protect the people".

In 2014, rather than seek re-election, Bies chose to seek the Republican nomination for Wisconsin Secretary of State. He lost in the Republican primary of August 12, 2014, with 75,340 votes (35%) to 138,734 votes (65%) for Julian Bradley. He was succeeded in the Assembly by Republican Joel Kitchens, who defeated Democrat Joe Majeski in the 2014 general election.
