= Angela Stroud =

21st century American politician

Angela Stroud Ph.D.

Member of the Wisconsin State Assembly from the 73rd district
- Incumbent
- Assumed office January 6, 2025
- Preceded by: Angie Sapik

Personal details
- Born: January 24, 1981 (age 45) McAllen, Texas, U.S.
- Party: Democratic
- Spouse: Cynthia Belmont
- Children: 4
- Education: University of Texas at Austin (Ph.D., M.A.); Southwestern University (B.A.)
- Profession: Educator, politician, author
- Website: Official website Campaign website

Angela Stroud (born 1981) is an American educator, author, and Democratic politician from Ashland, Wisconsin. She is a member of the Wisconsin State Assembly, representing Wisconsin's 73rd Assembly district since January 2025. She previously worked as a professor of sociology at Northland College.

== Early life and career ==
Stroud was born in McAllen, Texas, a city roughly ten miles north of the Mexican city of Reynosa, on January 24, 1981. During her childhood, she and her family would cross the border into Mexico at various times to shop and dine and often encountered extreme poverty among the populace in both the United States and Mexico. In her youth, she attended McAllen High School, graduating in 1999. For the next four years, she attended Southwestern University, where she got a Bachelor of Arts in sociology and gender studies, graduating in 2003. For the next 9 years, she attended the University of Texas at Austin, earning a M.A. in sociology in 2006 and a Ph.D. in sociology in 2012.

While she was earning her Ph.D., Stroud taught as a professor of sociology at the University of Texas at Austin from 2008 until 2012.

Following the completion of her Ph.D., Stroud moved to Ashland, Wisconsin, in 2012 and began teaching at Northland College. At Northland, Stroud served as a professor of Sociology and Social Justice, where she taught courses including Sociology of Gender and Sexuality, Undoing Racism, Sociology of Community, Human Rights and Social Justice, and Introduction to Sociology.

In the spring of 2024, Stroud was involved in efforts to prevent Northland College from shutting down. As part of these efforts, she proposed reductions in staff and the number of students, as well as renting out residential halls and office spaces. Stroud, along with eight other faculty members, was laid off in May, at the end of the 2023–2024 school year as part of an initial restructuring plan meant to keep Northland College open.

== Political career ==
Due to redistricting, the 73rd district's incumbent representative Angie Sapik announced she would not seek re-election in 2024, after which Stroud entered the race. She faced a primary against John Adams, a member of the Washburn City Board and candidate for the 74th district in 2022. During the campaign, Stroud ran on giving more public funding to Wisconsin public schools and supporting more environmental regulations, especially to combat PFAS contamination. In the primary election, she won the Democratic nomination with 80% of the primary vote. Stroud went on to win the general election, receiving about 58% of the vote against Republican Frank Kostka, a former Department Commander for the Wisconsin American Legion and member of the Wisconsin American Legion Board of Directors.

Stroud was sworn in on January 6, 2025.

With the opening of the 107th Wisconsin Legislature Stroud joined the Legislative LGBTQ+ Caucus. In November 2025, Stroud and freshman senator Jodi Habush Sinykin introduced legislation to regulate AI data centers in the state. The bill as proposed would have required companies building the data centers pay their workers a prevailing wage, and establish "clear statewide guardrails" for the industry.

== Personal life and family ==
Stroud lives in Gingles, Wisconsin, with her partner Cynthia, her stepson, and their rescue dog Mae. Stroud has four children and two grandchildren.

== Works ==
=== Essays ===
- Good Guys with Guns: The Appeal and Consequences of Concealed Carry
- Book Review: Land, God, and Guns: Settler Colonialism and Masculinity in the American Heartland
- The Lives of Guns
- Who's country? : politics and ideology in country music
- Self-Defense and Personal Responsibility
- Who Looks Suspicious? Racialized Surveillance in a Predominantly White Neighborhood
- Guns don’t kill people…: good guys and the legitimization of gun violence
- GOOD GUYS WITH GUNS: Hegemonic Masculinity and Concealed Handguns

== Electoral history ==
=== Wisconsin Assembly (2024) ===
Year	Election	Date	Elected				Defeated				Total	Plurality
2024	Primary	Aug. 13	Angela Stroud	Democratic	6,490	80.13%	John Adams	Dem.	1,603	19.79%	8,099	4,887
2024	General	Nov. 5	Angela Stroud	Democratic	19,265	58.32%	Frank Kostka	Rep.	13,720	41.53%	33,033	5,545

Wisconsin State Assembly
Preceded by Angie Sapik	Member of the Wisconsin State Assembly from the 73rd district January 6, 2025 – present	Incumbent
