= Angie Sapik =

American politician (born 1984)

Member of the Wisconsin State Assembly from the 73rd district
- In office January 3, 2023 – January 6, 2025
- Preceded by: Nick Milroy
- Succeeded by: Angela Stroud

Member of the Douglas County Board of Supervisors from the 20th district
- Incumbent
- Assumed office April 16, 2024
- Preceded by: Jim Borgeson

Personal details
- Born: Angela Mary Vee; August 4, 1984 (age 42) Grand Rapids, Minnesota, U.S.
- Party: Republican
- Spouse: Nathan Sapik
- Children: 2
- Education: University of Wisconsin–Eau Claire; Duluth Business University (AS)
- Occupation: Sales

Angela Mary "Angie" Sapik (née Vee; born August 4, 1984) is an American sales professional and Republican politician from Douglas County, Wisconsin. She served one term as a member of the Wisconsin State Assembly, representing Wisconsin's 73rd Assembly district during the 2023–2024 term. She is a candidate for Wisconsin's 25th Senate district in the 2026 election.

== Biography ==
Angie Sapik was born Angela Mary Vee in Grand Rapids, Minnesota and was raised in Superior, Wisconsin. She graduated from Northwestern High School, in the town of Maple, Wisconsin, and went on to attend University of Wisconsin–Eau Claire for two years. She ultimately earned her associate's degree from Duluth Business University. For the last ten years, she has worked as a sales associate for her family business, Vee's Marketing, Inc. Angie also put out a series of tweets using her official twitter handle moosobay encouraging the Jan. 6th insurrectionists supporting what they were doing. Tweets included "it's war" and in another tweet supporting the insurrectionists "standing up for their rights" she hash tagged it as "#DCriots" and "#imwithyou". She also has a tweet claiming the St. Louis couple who brandished firearms when the BLM (Black Lives Matter) protest were happening "they should've started blasting".

== Political career ==
After surviving the closest election in the Wisconsin Legislature in 2020, incumbent state representative Nick Milroy announced in April 2022 that he would not run for an 8th term in the Assembly that Fall. A few weeks later, Sapik announced her candidacy for the Republican nomination in the 73rd district seat being vacated by Milroy. She defeated Douglas County supervisor Scott Luostari in the Republican primary and went on to face child services consultant Laura Gapske in the general election. In the November general election, the 73rd Assembly district was again one of the closest legislative races in the state. Sapik prevailed by 490 votes.

The 2024 legislative redistricting act significantly altered Sapik's 73rd Assembly district, and Sapik announced in March 2024 that she would not run for another term in office.

Following the redistricting Sapik filed a write-in campaign for the 20th district on the Douglas County Board of Supervisors. No other candidates filed to run for the seat and Sapik was elected with 76 votes out of 152 write-in votes.

== Personal life and family ==
Angela Vee is one of three children of Scott Vee. Her father founded the produce company Vee's Marketing, Inc., in 1989. Her father is now retired and her brother owns and runs the business.

Angela Vee took the last name Sapik when she married Nathan Sapik, in September 2012. They live in Lake Nebagamon, Wisconsin, with their two children.

== Electoral history ==
=== Wisconsin Assembly (2022) ===
Year	Election	Date	Elected				Defeated				Total	Plurality
2022	Primary	Aug. 9	Angie Sapik	Republican	2,872	57.84%	Scott Luostari	Rep.	2,081	41.91%	4,965	791
2022	General	Nov. 8	Angie Sapik	Republican	13,268	50.83%	Laura R. Gapske	Dem.	12,778	48.96%	26,101	490

=== Douglas County Board of Supervisors (2024) ===
Year	Election	Date	Elected				Defeated				Total	Plurality
2024	General	Apr. 2	Angie Sapik (write-in)	Nonpartisan	76	50.00%	Danna Livingston-Matherly (write-in)	Non.	53	34.86%	152	23
2024	General	Apr. 2	Angie Sapik (write-in)	Nonpartisan	76	50.00%	Jacob Moss (write-in)	Non.	17	11.18%	152	23
2024	General	Apr. 2	Angie Sapik (write-in)	Nonpartisan	76	50.00%	Jim Borgeson (inc) (write-in)	Non.	2	1.32%	152	23
2024	General	Apr. 2	Angie Sapik (write-in)	Nonpartisan	76	50.00%	James Delanghe (write-in)	Non.	1	0.66%	152	23
2024	General	Apr. 2	Angie Sapik (write-in)	Nonpartisan	76	50.00%	Sam Jones (write-in)	Non.	1	0.66%	152	23
2024	General	Apr. 2	Angie Sapik (write-in)	Nonpartisan	76	50.00%	Robert Olee (write-in)	Non.	1	0.66%	152	23
2024	General	Apr. 2	Angie Sapik (write-in)	Nonpartisan	76	50.00%	Bill Wilson (write-in)	Non.	1	0.66%	152	23

=== Wisconsin Senate (2026) ===
Year	Election	Date	Elected				Defeated				Total	Plurality
2026	Primary	Aug. 11	Erik Severson	Republican	13,220	53.88%	Angie Sapik	Rep.	11,302	46.06%	24,536	1,918

Wisconsin State Assembly
Preceded by Nick Milroy	Member of the Wisconsin State Assembly from the 73rd district January 3, 2023 – January 6, 2025	Succeeded by Angela Stroud
