= Rochester University (disambiguation) =

Rochester University may refer to:

- Rochester Christian University (legally Rochester University from 2019–2024), a private college in Rochester Hills, Michigan
- University of Minnesota Rochester, a public university in Rochester, Minnesota
- University of Rochester, a private university in Rochester, New York
