= Globe University and Minnesota School of Business =

For-profit higher education provider in Minnesota, US

Coordinates: 44.9455°N 92.9421°W

- Former name: Globe College (1885-2007)
- Type: Private for-profit higher education network
- Active: 1877; 149 years ago – 2017; 9 years ago
- Students: Approx 10,000 (2009)
- Location: Multiple campuses, Minnesota, Wisconsin, and South Dakota, United States

Globe University and Minnesota School of Business (Globe/MSB) was a private for-profit higher education network based in Washington County, Minnesota, United States. The network had multiple campuses in Minnesota, Wisconsin, and South Dakota.

In September 2016, the state of Minnesota stopped the business from operating in the state. All Globe/MSB locations were permanently closed by 2017 because they lost their federal student aid funding.

== History ==
=== Minnesota School of Business ===
Minnesota School of Business was founded in 1877 by Professor Alexander R. Archibald, previously of Dartmouth College. He and an assistant taught classes in bookkeeping, shorthand, English, and penmanship in a three-room school in Minneapolis, Minnesota. For 12 years the school was called Archibald Business College. In 1890 the school was purchased by Charles T. Rickard and Grove A. Gruman and moved to larger facilities in the Jewelers’ Exchange Building in Minneapolis.

In 1929, the school was sold to the Correll and Kamprath families and was relocated to 24 South Seventh Street. In 1979 the School was moved again to the Chamber of Commerce Building in Minneapolis.

In 1969 ITT Educational Services Inc. purchased the school. Terry L. Myhre purchased the school in January 1988.

All Minnesota School of Business locations were permanently closed as of 2017.

=== Globe University ===
Globe College was founded in 1885 by Frank A. Maron, who was born and educated in Germany. An accomplished scholar, he received a classical education in his native country. Recognizing a need for a practical education for young men and women, he established Globe College in Minnesota. From its inception, the university stressed the teaching of business as it is practiced.

In October 1972, Helmer Myhre and Terry Myhre purchased the college. In June 2007, it was renamed Globe University.

All Globe University locations were permanently closed as of 2017.

=== Lawsuit leading to closure ===
In 2011, Heidi Weber, a former dean, filed a whistleblower-wrongful termination lawsuit against Globe/MSB. In 2013, her case went to jury trial in the Washington County Courthouse. After a seven-day trial, a jury found in her favor and awarded $395,000 plus interest to the former dean. This is now called the first whistleblower case/trial of a for-profit institution of higher education.

Globe/MSB appealed the ruling; however, the Minnesota Supreme Court upheld Weber's verdict. A judge ruled that Globe/MSB must additionally pay in excess of $995,000 (including attorney costs for Weber) for wrongful termination after she reported the school's unethical practices and was retaliated against by being fired.

In July 2014, Minnesota Attorney General Lori Swanson announced that the state was suing Globe/MSB. The lawsuit "[alleges that] the for-profit schools misled criminal justice program students about their career prospects." The suit contends that the school used high pressure sales tactics and misled students regarding the acceptance of their degrees and credits for the careers the students wanted.

In 2013, the schools were sued by former students making similar allegations. Globe/MSB disputed the allegations.

In 2016, Globe/MSB closed several campuses which it attributed to the lawsuit and a "three-year negative publicity campaign." The following year, the Minnesota Supreme Court found that student loans offered by the school, which carried interest rates as high as 18 percent, were illegal and that the schools issued the loans without the proper license.

In June 2018, the Minnesota Court of Appeals held that the "schools in this matter engaged in wrongful conduct in violation of the MCFA" but upheld damages only for those students who testified at trial. However, in November 2019, the Minnesota Supreme Court ruled that any of the students who attended the criminal justice programs since 2009 can request reimbursement for tuition, fees, and other education-related expenses, including interest. A couple of weeks after the ruling, Globe/MSB filed for Chapter 11 bankruptcy protection, saying they owe many millions of dollars in connection with the awards against the school.

== Academics ==
Globe University and Minnesota School of Business awarded Doctor of Business Administration, Master of Science in Management, Master of Business Administration, bachelor of science and associate in applied science degrees, diplomas, and certificates.

== Campus locations ==
Campus Name	Location	Year opened	Year closed
Globe University-Appleton	Grand Chute, Wisconsin	October 2010	December 2016
Minnesota School of Business-Blaine	Blaine, Minnesota	January 2007	June 2017
Minnesota School of Business-Brooklyn Center	Brooklyn Center, Minnesota	July 1999	August 2016
Globe University-Eau Claire	Eau Claire, Wisconsin	July 2008	December 2016
Minnesota School of Business-Elk River	Elk River, Minnesota	July 2009	September 2016
Globe University-Green Bay	Bellevue, Wisconsin	July 2010	December 2016
Globe University-La Crosse	Onalaska, Wisconsin	October 2009	December 2016
Minnesota School of Business-Lakeville	Lakeville, Minnesota	October 2009	June 2016
Globe University-Madison East	Madison, Wisconsin	January 2009	December 2016
Globe University-Madison West	Middleton, Wisconsin	July 2009	December 2016
Globe University-Minneapolis Downtown	Minneapolis, Minnesota, IDS Center	April 2008	September 2017
Minnesota School of Business-Moorhead	Moorhead, Minnesota	June 2008	September 2017
Minnesota School of Business-Plymouth	Plymouth, Minnesota	September 2002	September 2016
Minnesota School of Business-Richfield	Richfield, Minnesota	1993	September 2017
Minnesota School of Business-Rochester	Rochester, Minnesota	May 2009	March 2017
Minnesota School of Business-Shakopee	Shakopee, Minnesota	2006	January 2014
Globe University-Sioux Falls	Sioux Falls, South Dakota	October 2008	December 2016
Minnesota School of Business-St. Cloud	Waite Park, Minnesota	October 2004	March 2017
Globe University-Wausau	Rothschild, Wisconsin	April 2010	December 2016
Globe University-Woodbury	Woodbury, Minnesota	July 2007	September 2017

The Minnesota School of Business-Richfield also housed the Minnesota School of Business-Online Division and Globe University-Online Division.

== Affiliations ==
The Minnesota School of Business and Globe University were part of the now defunct Globe Education Network. Educational affiliates had included:

- Broadview University; campus located in West Jordan, Utah
- Duluth Business University; closed in June 2018
- Benchmark Learning; closed in September 2016
- Minnesota School of Cosmetology; campus located in Woodbury, Minnesota
- Institute of Production and Recording; campuses located in Minneapolis, Minnesota and Edina, Minnesota

Broadview University, Minnesota School of Cosmetology, and the Institute of Production and Recording are now part of the Broadview Education Consortium which is owned by Terry Myhre and his family, who had previously owned the Globe Education Network.
