= Gingles =

Gingles may refer to:

- Gingles, Wisconsin, town
- Thornburg v. Gingles, 1986 lawsuit
