= Louise M. Tesmer =

Retired American politician and judge (born 1942)

The Honorable Louise M. Tesmer

Wisconsin Circuit Court Judge for the Milwaukee Circuit, Branch 40
- In office August 1, 1989 – July 31, 2001
- Preceded by: Position established
- Succeeded by: Joseph R. Wall

Member of the Wisconsin State Assembly
- In office January 7, 1985 – July 31, 1989
- Preceded by: Jeffrey A. Neubauer
- Succeeded by: Rosemary Potter
- Constituency: 19th district
- In office January 3, 1983 – January 7, 1985
- Preceded by: Lary J. Swoboda
- Succeeded by: Lary J. Swoboda
- Constituency: 1st district
- In office January 1, 1973 – January 3, 1983
- Preceded by: Position established
- Succeeded by: Jeffrey A. Neubauer
- Constituency: 19th district

Personal details
- Born: December 25, 1942 (age 83) Milwaukee, Wisconsin, U.S.
- Party: Democratic
- Education: University of Wisconsin–Milwaukee (B.A.); University of Wisconsin Law School (J.D.)

Louise M. Tesmer (born December 25, 1942) is an American lawyer, judge, and former politician. She was a Wisconsin circuit court judge for 12 years in the Milwaukee County circuit (1989–2001), and has continued to serve as a reserve judge since her retirement. Prior to her judicial service, she served sixteen years in the Wisconsin State Assembly, representing the city of Milwaukee as a Democrat.

== Early life and career ==
Born in Milwaukee, Wisconsin, Tesmer graduated from Bay View High School. She then received her bachelor's degree from University of Wisconsin–Milwaukee in 1964 and went on to earn her J.D. from University of Wisconsin Law School in 1967.

== Public office ==
Even before graduating from law school she ran for her first public office. At age 23, she was elected municipal court judge in the Milwaukee suburb of St. Francis in the 1966 spring election. After graduating from law school, she was hired as an assistant district attorney for Milwaukee County, which was her primary employment until her election to the Wisconsin State Assembly in 1972.

In 1972, Tesmer announced she would launch a primary challenge against 24-year incumbent U.S. Congressman Clement J. Zablocki. Tesmer established a platform on opposition to the Vietnam War and support for progressive tax reform. She asserted that Zablocki had been too supportive of President Richard Nixon's war policies, and had lost touch with the needs of his constituents. Tesmer withdrew her candidacy, however, when another "peace" candidate—Grant Waldo—announced he would enter the race against Zablocki.

Instead, Tesmer launched a primary challenge against 12-year incumbent Democratic state representative John E. McCormick, in the newly drawn 19th State Assembly district. Before the primary, however, McCormick was granted a judicial appointment and quit the race. Tesmer ultimately faced five other candidates in the primary for the now-open seat. In the September primary, she prevailed with 45% of the six-way vote and went on to take nearly 70% of the general election vote over Republican Ebner Luetzow. She went on to win reelection 8 times, serving until 1989.

During her time in the Assembly, Tesmer served as chairperson of the Assembly Committee on Financial Institutions and Insurance (1987–1989) and was a member of the Judiciary Committee for her entire time in the legislature. She was also elected Speaker pro tempore (then referred to as "Deputy Speaker") by her caucus for the 1981–1982 session of the legislature, becoming the first woman to serve in the Assembly leadership.

In 1989, Tesmer entered the race for Milwaukee County's newest branch of the Wisconsin circuit courts. In a crowded seven-person nonpartisan primary, she prevailed again with 38%, and went on to win the April election with 63%. Two of her former primary opponents in the election—Daniel L. Konkol and Robert Crawford—would later go on to serve as circuit court judges. She was reelected in 1995 and retired at the end of her second term in 2001. As of 2021, she continues to serve as a reserve judge in the 1st judicial administrative district.

== Personal life ==
Tesmer appeared on the popular television gameshow What's My Line? in 1966, with Betty White and Allen Ludden as guest panelists.

== Electoral history ==
=== Wisconsin Assembly, 19th district (1972–1980) ===
Year	Election	Date	Elected				Defeated				Total	Plurality
1972	Primary	September 12	Louise M. Tesmer	Democratic	2,566	45.06%	Dennis J. Klazura	Dem.	1,074	18.86%	5,695	1,492
1972	Primary	September 12	Louise M. Tesmer	Democratic	2,566	45.06%	Robert E. McCormick	Dem.	806	14.15%	5,695	1,492
1972	Primary	September 12	Louise M. Tesmer	Democratic	2,566	45.06%	David R. Zepecki	Dem.	720	12.64%	5,695	1,492
1972	Primary	September 12	Louise M. Tesmer	Democratic	2,566	45.06%	Daniel M. Rozeski	Dem.	468	8.22%	5,695	1,492
1972	Primary	September 12	Louise M. Tesmer	Democratic	2,566	45.06%	Matthew S. Chutich	Dem.	61	1.07%	5,695	1,492
1972	General	November 7	Louise M. Tesmer	Democratic	13,202	69.35%	Ebner H. Luetzow	Rep.	5,834	30.65%	19,036	7,368
1974	Primary	September 10	Louise M. Tesmer (inc.)	Democratic	3,276	83.57%	Richard R. Matthews	Dem.	644	16.43%	3,920	2,632
1974	General	November 5	Louise M. Tesmer (inc.)	Democratic	9,237	100.0%					9,237	9,237
1976	Primary	September 14	Louise M. Tesmer (inc.)	Democratic	3,709	62.81%	Ralph Voltner	Dem.	1,257	21.29%	5,905	2,452
1976	Primary	September 14	Louise M. Tesmer (inc.)	Democratic	3,709	62.81%	Ronald L. Tessmer	Dem.	939	15.90%	5,905	2,452
1976	General	November 2	Louise M. Tesmer (inc.)	Democratic	15,220	100.0%					15,220	15,220
1978	Primary	September 12	Louise M. Tesmer (inc.)	Democratic	3,239	62.98%	Carole Ewald	Dem.	894	17.38%	5,143	2,345
1978	Primary	September 12	Louise M. Tesmer (inc.)	Democratic	3,239	62.98%	Charles J. Lacke	Dem.	634	12.33%	5,143	2,345
1978	Primary	September 12	Louise M. Tesmer (inc.)	Democratic	3,239	62.98%	Thomas Brennan	Dem.	376	7.31%	5,143	2,345
1978	General	November 7	Louise M. Tesmer (inc.)	Democratic	10,006	71.34%	Fred L. McCabe II	Rep.	4,019	28.66%	14,025	5,987
1980	General	November 4	Louise M. Tesmer (inc.)	Democratic	13,295	70.54%	John J. Mackey	Rep.	5,552	29.46%	18,847	7,743

=== Wisconsin Assembly, 1st district (1982) ===
Year	Election	Date	Elected				Defeated				Total	Plurality
1982	Primary	September 14	Louise M. Tesmer	Democratic	4,582	58.70%	Phillip J. Tuczynski	Dem.	3,224	41.30%	7,806	1,358
1982	General	November 2	Louise M. Tesmer	Democratic	13,103	83.95%	William A. Rinnemaki	Rep.	2,223	14.24%	15,608	10,880
1982	General	November 2	Louise M. Tesmer	Democratic	13,103	83.95%	Elaine Bergstrom	Lib.	282	1.81%	15,608	10,880

=== Wisconsin Assembly, 19th district (1984–1988) ===
Year	Election	Date	Elected				Defeated				Total	Plurality
1984	General	November 6	Louise M. Tesmer	Democratic	16,147	75.23%	Douglas D. Haag	Rep.	5,316	24.77%	21,463	10,831
1986	General	November 4	Louise M. Tesmer (inc.)	Democratic	10,198	69.48%	Douglas D. Haag	Rep.	4,480	30.52%	14,678	5,718
1988	General	November 8	Louise M. Tesmer (inc.)	Democratic	15,731	78.32%	Douglas D. Haag	Rep.	4,354	21.68%	20,085	11,377

=== Wisconsin Circuit Court (1989, 1995) ===
Wisconsin Circuit Court, Milwaukee Circuit, Branch 40 Election, 1989
Party	Candidate	Votes	%
Nonpartisan Primary, February 21, 1989
Nonpartisan	Louise M. Tesmer	17,148	38.40%
Nonpartisan	Sheila M. Parrish	5,741	12.85%
Nonpartisan	Daniel L. Konkol	5,286	11.84%
Nonpartisan	Anthony J. Machi	5,275	11.81%
Nonpartisan	James F. Blask	4,576	10.25%
Nonpartisan	David M. Kaiser	3,646	8.16%
Nonpartisan	Robert Crawford	2,990	6.69%
Total votes		44,662	100.0%
General Election, April 4, 1989
Nonpartisan	Louise M. Tesmer	78,586	63.77%
Nonpartisan	Sheila M. Parrish	44,642	36.23%
Plurality		33,944	27.55%
Total votes		123,228	100.0%

Wisconsin State Assembly
New district	Member of the Wisconsin State Assembly from the 19th district January 1, 1973 – January 3, 1983	Succeeded by Jeffrey A. Neubauer
Preceded by Lary J. Swoboda	Member of the Wisconsin State Assembly from the 1st district January 3, 1983 – January 7, 1985	Succeeded by Lary J. Swoboda
Preceded by Jeffrey A. Neubauer	Member of the Wisconsin State Assembly from the 19th district January 7, 1985 – July 31, 1989	Succeeded by Rosemary Potter
Legal offices
New branch	Wisconsin Circuit Court Judge for the Milwaukee Circuit, Branch 40; August 1, 1989 – July 31, 2001	Succeeded by Joseph R. Wall
