= David E. Hutchison =

American politician

Member of the Wisconsin State Assembly from the 1st district
- In office January 3, 1995 – January 3, 2001
- Preceded by: Lary J. Swoboda
- Succeeded by: Garey Bies

Personal details
- Born: July 26, 1943 (age 83) New London, Wisconsin
- Party: Republican
- Children: 8
- Education: St. Norbert College

David E. Hutchison (born July 26, 1943) is a former member of the Wisconsin State Assembly.

== Biography ==
Hutchison was born on July 26, 1943, in New London, Wisconsin. In 1965, he graduated from St. Norbert College. Hutchison is a member of the Knights of Columbus and Ducks Unlimited. He is married with eight children.

== Career ==
Hutchison was first elected to the Assembly in 1994. He is a Republican.
