= Joel Kitchens =

21st century American politician

Joel C. Kitchens

Member of the Wisconsin State Assembly from the 1st district
- Incumbent
- Assumed office January 6, 2015
- Preceded by: Garey Bies

Personal details
- Born: September 20, 1957 (age 69) Washington D.C.
- Party: Republican
- Spouse: Sherry
- Children: 3
- Education: Ohio State University (BS, DVM)
- Profession: Veterinarian
- Website: Official website; Campaign website

Joel C. Kitchens (born September 20, 1957) is an American veterinarian and Republican politician from Door County, Wisconsin. He is a member of the Wisconsin State Assembly representing the 1st Assembly district since 2015.

== Early life and career ==
Born in Washington, D.C., to Thomas W. Kitchens Jr. and Fleurette Kitchens, Kitchens moved around frequently as his father served in various positions with the Federal Bureau of Investigation. Kitchens received his bachelor's degree and doctor of veterinary medicine degrees from Ohio State University. He moved to Sturgeon Bay, Wisconsin, and began a veterinarian practice there in 1984.

== State Assembly ==
He was elected to the Sturgeon Bay School District Board of Education in 1999, eventually becoming its President . On November 4, 2014, Kitchens was elected to the Wisconsin State Assembly as a Republican.

=== Remarks on abortion ===
In January 2024, Kitchens received worldwide attention after stating, during an Assembly debate on abortion, that as a veterinarian he was probably the most expert person in the room on female pregnancies. "The question is whether abortion is health care and if you believe that a fetus is a human life, then abortion is not health care," he said. "In my veterinary career, I did thousands of ultrasounds on animals... I think I know mammalian fetal development better than anyone here. And in my mind, there’s absolutely no question that’s a life."

== Electoral history ==
=== Wisconsin Assembly (2014–present) ===
| Year | Election | Date | Elected | | | | Defeated | | | | Total | Plurality |
|---|---|---|---|---|---|---|---|---|---|---|---|---|
| 2014 | Primary | Aug. 12 | Joel C. Kitchens | Republican | 2,935 | 43.98% | Paul M. Feit | Rep. | 1,841 | 27.58% | 6,674 | 1,094 |
| 2014 | Primary | Aug. 12 | Joel C. Kitchens | Republican | 2,935 | 43.98% | Terry McNulty | Rep. | 1,281 | 19.19% | 6,674 | 1,094 |
| 2014 | Primary | Aug. 12 | Joel C. Kitchens | Republican | 2,935 | 43.98% | Brian Hackbarth | Rep. | 616 | 9.23% | 6,674 | 1,094 |
| 2014 | General | Nov. 4 | Joel C. Kitchens | Republican | 16,072 | 56.70% | Joe Majeski | Dem. | 12,256 | 43.24% | 28,345 | 3,816 |
| 2016 | General | Nov. 8 | Joel Kitchens (inc) | Republican | 20,044 | 60.11% | Lynn Utesch | Dem. | 13,289 | 39.85% | 33,347 | 6,755 |
| 2018 | General | Nov. 6 | Joel C. Kitchens (inc) | Republican | 20,651 | 68.38% | Roberta Thelen | Ind. | 9,519 | 31.52% | 30,202 | 11,132 |
| 2020 | General | Nov. 3 | Joel Kitchens (inc) | Republican | 23,441 | 61.82% | Kim Delorit Jensen | Dem. | 14,462 | 38.14% | 37,920 | 2,007 |
| 2022 | Primary | Aug. 9 | Joel Kitchens (inc) | Republican | 6,893 | 77.49% | Milt Swagel | Rep. | 1,992 | 22.39% | 8,895 | 4,901 |
| 2022 | General | Nov. 8 | Joel Kitchens (inc) | Republican | 19,864 | 62.45% | Roberta Thelen | Dem. | 11,916 | 37.46% | 31,806 | 7,948 |
| 2024 | Primary | Aug. 13 | Joel Kitchens (inc) | Republican | 7,858 | 77.15% | Milt Swagel | Rep. | 2,319 | 22.76% | 10,186 | 5,539 |
| 2024 | General | Nov. 5 | Joel Kitchens (inc) | Republican | 24,101 | 61.91% | Renee Paplham | Dem. | 14,801 | 38.02% | 38,929 | 9,300 |
| 2024 | General | Nov. 5 | Joel Kitchens (inc) | Republican | 24,101 | 61.91% | Milt Swagel (write-in) | Ind. | 5 | 0.01% | 38,929 | 9,300 |

Wisconsin State Assembly
| Preceded by Garey Bies | Member of the Wisconsin State Assembly from the 1st district January 6, 2015 – present | Incumbent |
