= Northwestern Health Sciences University =

Alternative healthcare university in Bloomington, Minnesota, USA

- Type: Private university
- Established: 1941
- President: Deb Bushway
- Academic staff: 138
- Students: 915
- Undergraduates: 137
- Doctoral students: 677
- Location: Bloomington, Minnesota, United States; 44°51′3″N 93°18′43″W
- Website: www.nwhealth.edu

Northwestern Health Sciences University (NWHSU) is a private university focused on alternative health care and located in Bloomington, Minnesota. The university has educational programs in acupuncture and Chinese medicine, chiropractic, massage therapy, radiation therapy, radiologic technology, undergraduate/Bachelor of Science completion, post Baccalaureate prehealth and online programs in integrative care, health coaching and nutrition. The university was founded in 1941 by John B. Wolfe, DC.

Previously known as the Northwestern College of Chiropractic, Northwestern Health Sciences University has focused on alternative and integrative health care education, patient care, and research for over 70 years. Since 1991, NWHSU's Wolfe-Harris Center for Clinical Studies has become one of the largest natural health care research institutions in the United States.

== History ==
Founded in 1941, the College of Chiropractic offers a doctor of chiropractic degree (DC). The college has created a clinical system, with several natural care centers, more than 150 community-based private-practice clinics, and final-term preceptorship opportunities around the world. The university's public clinic system records more than 65,000 patient visits a year, making Northwestern the largest provider of natural health care services in Minnesota.

The College of Acupuncture and Chinese Medicine is the largest and oldest school in Minnesota accredited by the Accreditation Commission for Acupuncture and Herbal Medicine. In 1999, the Minnesota Institute of Acupuncture and Herbal Studies, which had been founded by Minnesota acupuncture pioneer, the late Edith R. Davis, merged with NWHSU. The merger created the Minnesota College of Acupuncture and Chinese Medicine, which continued offering a Master of Acupuncture and Master of Oriental Medicine. In April 2020, NWHSU announced the opening of a new college, The College of Acupuncture and Chinese Medicine (CACM) which offers a Master of Acupuncture and Chinese Medicine (MAc) and a Doctor of Acupuncture with Chinese Medicine Herbal Medicine (DacCHM) degree option.

In 2000, NWHSU created the Massage Therapy Program and graduated its first class in the spring of 2002. The School of Massage Therapy offers an Associate of Applied Science in Massage Therapy (A.A.S.), Therapeutic Massage Certificate, East West Therapeutic Massage Certificate, Relaxation Massage Certificate and Shiatsu Certificate. All programs have a structured clinical experience within the School of Massage Therapy Teaching Clinic and other community sites. Students receive a professional certificate in massage therapy upon successful completion.

In June 2019, NWHSU announced that the Higher Learning Commission approved the transfer of students in the Twin Cities area whose educational plans were interrupted by the sudden closing of Argosy University. The HLC approved to accept students transferring from Argosy in five health-focused degree programs.

== Academics ==
Northwestern Health Sciences University offers 11 academic programs: Acupuncture and Chinese Medicine, Chiropractic, Message Therapy, Nutrition, Post Baccalaureate Pre-Health, Radiation Therapy, Radiologic Technology, and Undergraduate Health Sciences. The university is accredited by the Higher Learning Commission.

The curriculum for the Doctor of Chinese Medicine program provides about 3,000 hours of didactic and clinical instruction in acupuncture, Chinese herbology, and related studies such as Tui Na, Qigong, introductory Chinese language skills and practice management. The program takes three years of full-time enrollment to complete. The curriculum for the Master of Acupuncture program is similar to that of the Chinese medicine program, but does not include herbal studies. This program includes more than 2,300 hours of instruction, taking two and two-thirds years of full-time enrollment to complete.

The Master of Acupuncture and Doctor of Chinese Medicine programs are offered by the university are accredited by the Accreditation Commission for Acupuncture and Chinese Medicine.

The Doctor of Chiropractic program offered by the University is accredited by the Commission for Accreditation of the Council on Chiropractic education. The program offers an evidence-informed curriculum focused on clinical practice. The college is also regarded as a leader in Sports Chiropractic due to its popular and extensive sports and rehabilitation emphasis program. NWHSU's chiropractic program consistently ranks in the top 3 for board scores and has one of the highest graduation rates in the US. The full-time day program consists of 10 trimesters. The students may also complete a Bachelor of Science degree in human biology while enrolled in the chiropractic program.

The Massage Therapy program offered at NWHSU is the only massage therapy school in Minnesota to receive accreditation from the Commission on Massage Therapy Accreditation (COMTA).

== Campus ==
Northwestern Health Sciences University is located on a 25-acre (0.10 km^{2}) campus in suburban Bloomington. The campus has been renovated to accommodate the growing needs of the University which houses state-of-the-art laboratories, lecture halls, classrooms, a library, a bookstore, three public clinics, an auditorium, a cafeteria, a gymnasium, and a research center.

Founded on June 2, 1941, with just three students, Northwestern College of Chiropractic was first housed on the sixth floor of the W. T. Grant Department Store on Nicollet Avenue in downtown Minneapolis. The college quickly outgrew the space and relocated in 1949 to 2222 Park Ave. in Minneapolis.

In 1974 Northwestern moved to a former Catholic grade school at 1834 Mississippi Blvd. in St. Paul. Over the next decade, the college continued to grow. By 1983 it had reached capacity and a new building was needed. Thanks to a $500,000 donation from Dan Gainey, owner of Jostens Inc., the college moved to its current site in Bloomington.

== Student activities ==
Northwestern Health Sciences University has numerous student clubs and organizations, which comprise groups of students who share a common interest, either social or professional. The organizations reflect a wide range of interests, including an array of professional, social and recreational groups. Included among these many organizations are networks for international students and women students, opportunities for public speaking and engagement in public affairs. These organizations provide ready opportunities for participation in these and other special interests, and for personal and professional growth. The university also provides and sponsors extracurricular clubs and activities throughout the year including aerobics, baseball, basketball, soccer, mountain biking, skiing, and martial arts.

== Research ==
Northwestern Health Sciences University's Wolfe-Harris Center for Clinical Studies, located on the Bloomington campus, houses a natural health care research center. The center's two newest studies, focusing on back-related leg pain and integrative care for low back pain, pushed the university over the $7 million mark in total funding from federal agencies over the institutions entire history (since 1941). In addition, Northwestern Health Sciences University's research efforts are now being expanded to the other academic programs on campus.

== See also ==
- List of colleges and universities in Minnesota
- Higher education in Minnesota
