= Robert Jauch =

American politician (born 1945)

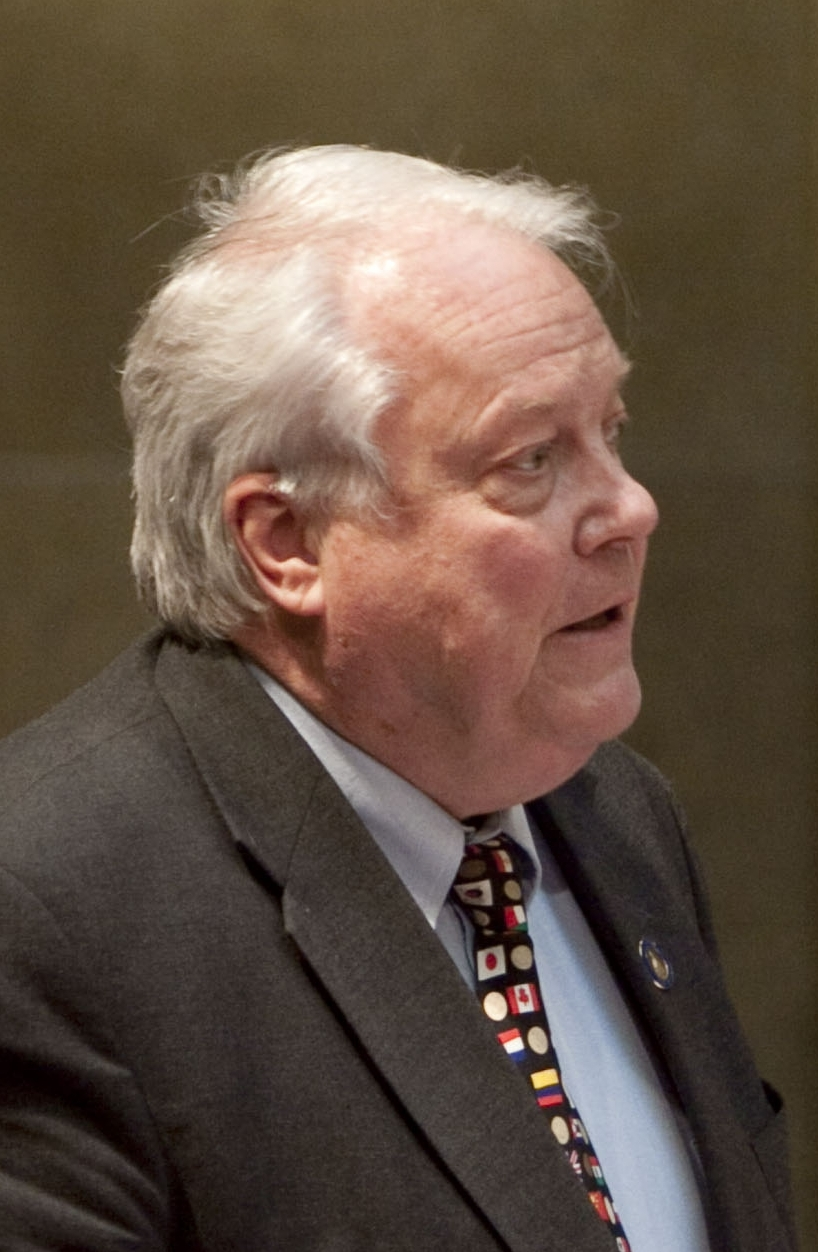

Minority Leader of the Wisconsin State Senate
- In office May 12, 1993 – October 17, 1995
- Preceded by: David Helbach
- Succeeded by: Chuck Chvala

Member of the Wisconsin Senate from the 25th district
- In office January 5, 1987 – January 5, 2015
- Preceded by: Daniel Theno
- Succeeded by: Janet Bewley

Member of the Wisconsin State Assembly
- In office January 7, 1985 – January 5, 1987
- Preceded by: Lary J. Swoboda
- Succeeded by: Frank Boyle
- Constituency: 73rd district
- In office January 3, 1983 – January 7, 1985
- Preceded by: Robert S. Travis Jr.
- Succeeded by: Robert S. Travis Jr.
- Constituency: 49th district

Personal details
- Born: November 22, 1945 (age 80) Wheaton, Illinois
- Party: Democratic

Military service
- Allegiance: United States
- Branch/service: United States Army
- Years of service: 1964–1968

Robert Jauch (born November 22, 1945) is an American retired Democratic politician. He served 28 years in the Wisconsin State Senate (1987–2015) and four years in the State Assembly (1983–1987). He retired in 2015, citing the increased partisanship in the Legislature.

== Background ==
Born in Wheaton, Illinois, Jauch graduated from Wheaton Central High School and then served in the United States Army 1964–1968. He went to University of Wisconsin–Eau Claire and University of Wisconsin–Superior. He served as field representative for United States Representative David Obey.

== Wisconsin legislature ==
During the protests in Wisconsin, Jauch, along with the 13 other Democratic State Senators, left the state to deny the State Senate a quorum on Governor Scott Walker's controversial "Budget Repair" legislation.
