= Wisconsin's 1st Assembly district =

American legislative district in northeast Wisconsin

Wisconsin's 1st State Assembly district
- 2024 map defined in 2023 Wisc. Act 94; 2022 map defined in Johnson v. Wisconsin Elections Commission; 2011 map was defined in 2011 Wisc. Act 43
Assemblymember
Joel Kitchens; R–Sturgeon Bay
since January 6, 2015 (11 years, 287 days)
- Demographics: 93.91% White; 0.64% Black; 2.7% Hispanic; 0.63% Asian; 1.43% Native American; 0.08% Hawaiian/Pacific Islander
- Population (2020) • Voting age: 59,444; 48,427
- Website: Official website
- Notes: Door Peninsula

The 1st Assembly district of Wisconsin is one of 99 districts in the Wisconsin State Assembly. Located in northeastern Wisconsin, the district comprises all of Door and Kewaunee counties, as well as portions of northeast Brown County. The district is represented by Republican Joel Kitchens, since January 2015.

The 1st Assembly district is located within Wisconsin's 1st Senate district, along with the 2nd and 3rd Assembly districts.

== History ==
The district was created in the 1972 redistricting act (1971 Wisc. Act 304) which first established the numbered district system, replacing the previous system which allocated districts to specific counties. The 1st district was drawn roughly in line with the boundaries of the previous Door–Kewaunee district; the last representative of that district, Lary J. Swoboda, continued as the representative of the 1st district after the 1972 election. The 1st district boundaries have remained relatively consistent in redistricting since 1972, with the major exception of the 1982 court-ordered redistricting, which scrambled all State Assembly districts and moved the 1st district to Milwaukee County for the 1983–1984 legislative session.

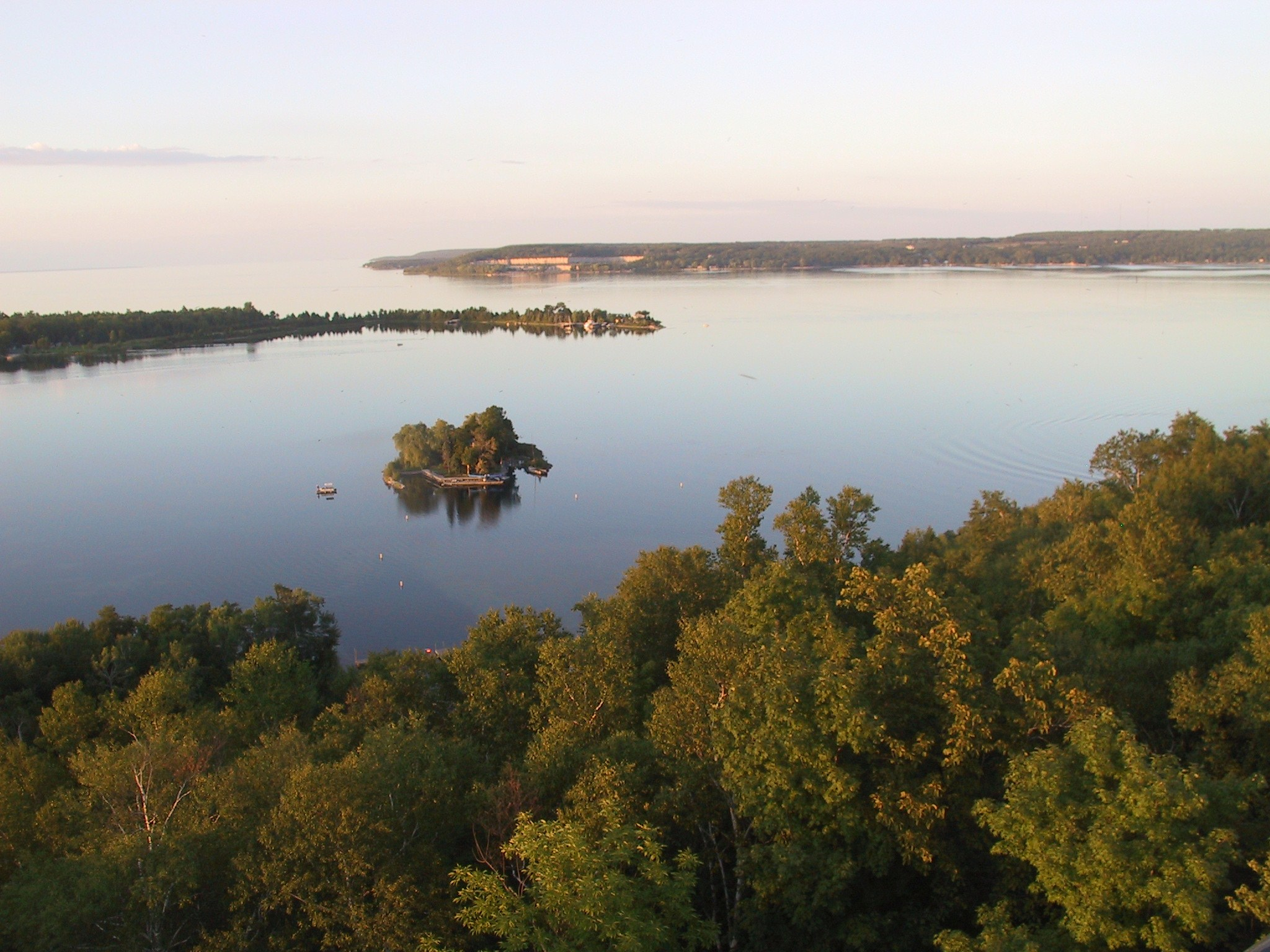
View from the Potawatomi State Park Observation Tower.

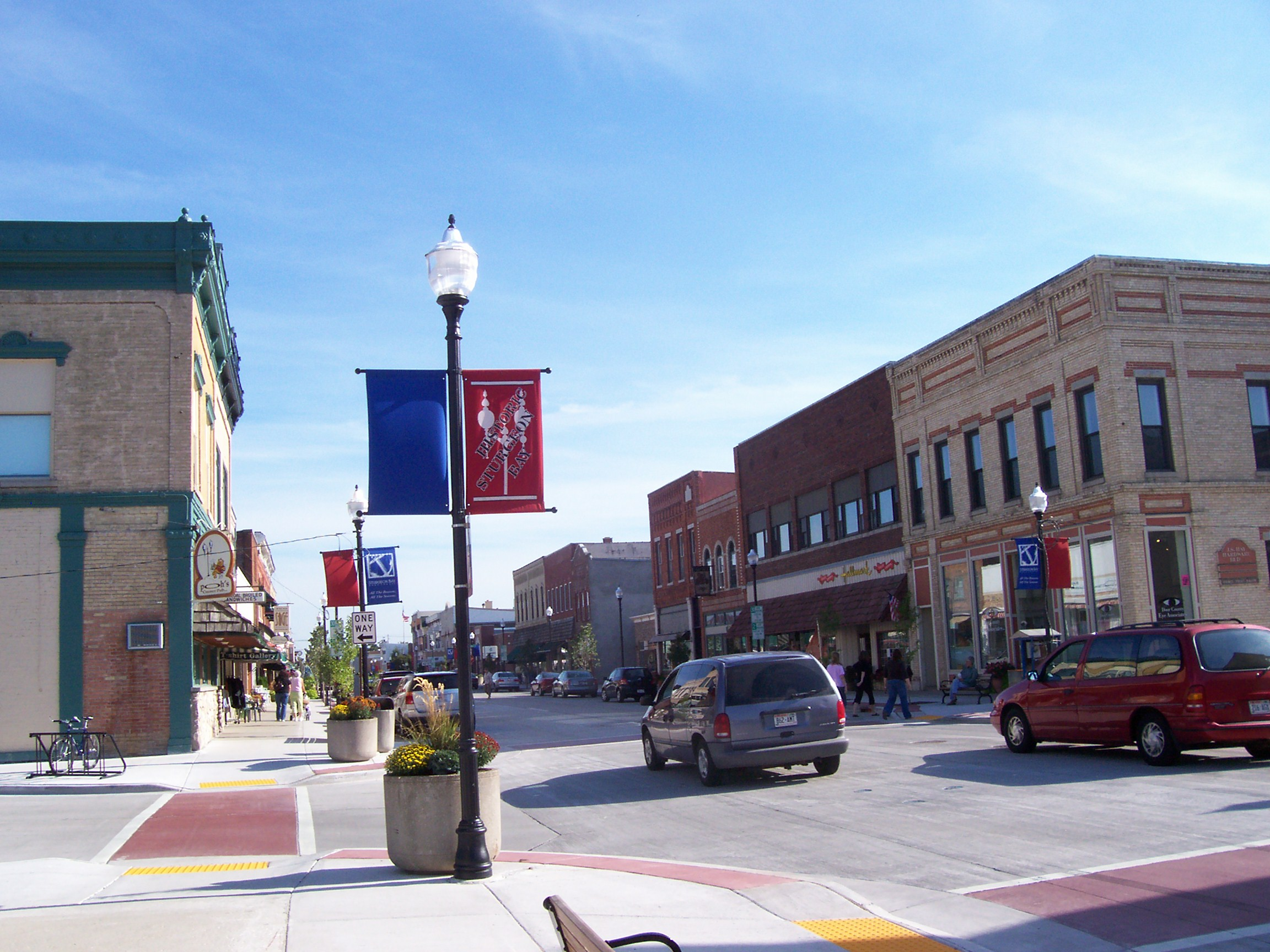
Third Avenue Historic District (Sturgeon Bay, Wisconsin).

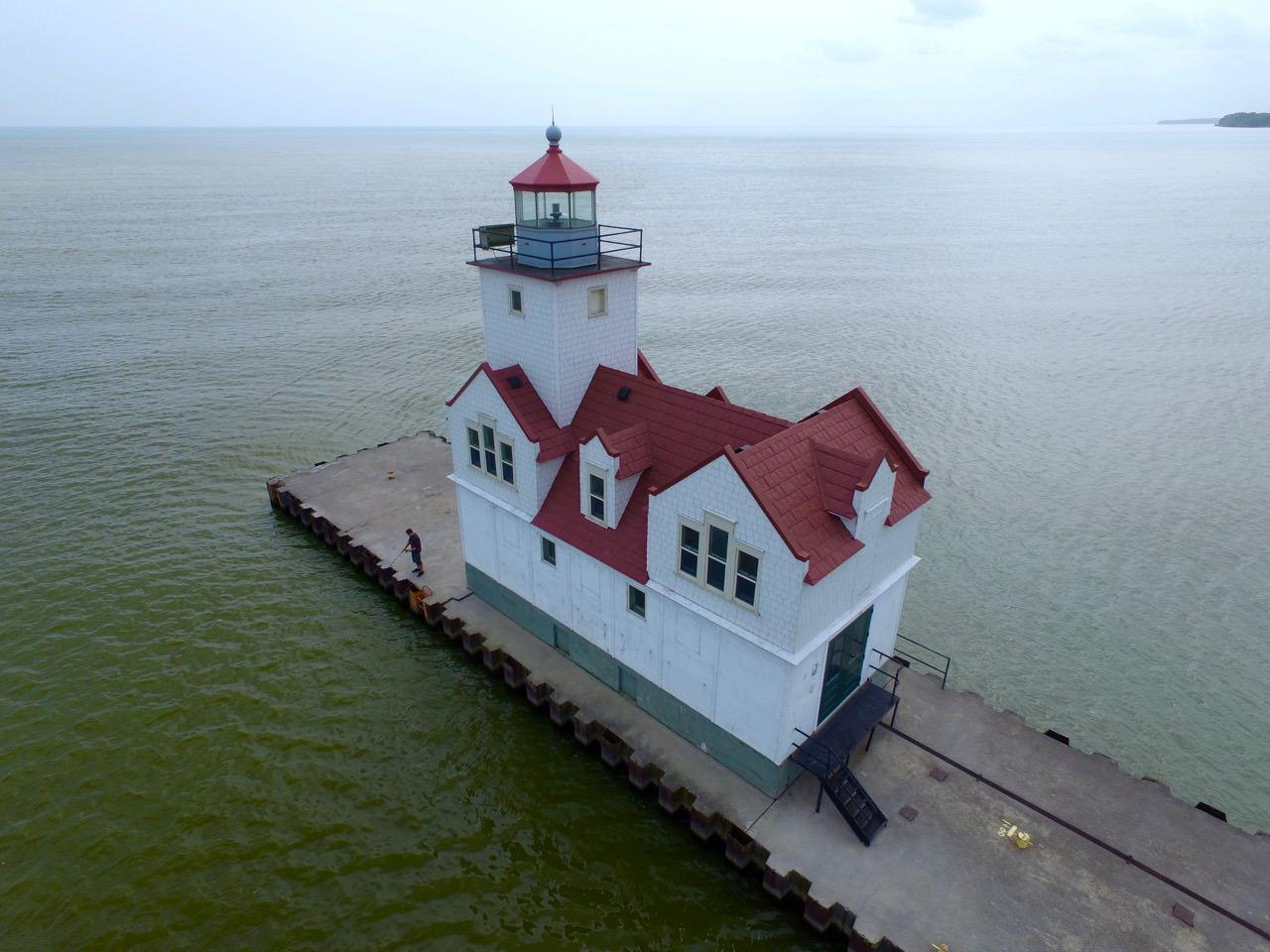
Kewaunee Pierhead Light.

== List of past representatives ==
List of representatives to the Wisconsin State Assembly from the 1st district
Member	Party	Residence	Counties represented	Term start	Term end	Ref.
District created
Lary J. Swoboda	Dem.	Luxemburg	Door, Kewaunee, Brown	January 1, 1973	January 3, 1983	
Louise M. Tesmer	Dem.	Milwaukee	Milwaukee	January 3, 1983	January 7, 1985	
Lary J. Swoboda	Dem.	Luxemburg	Door, Kewaunee, Brown	January 7, 1985	January 3, 1995	
David E. Hutchison	Rep.	Red River	Door, Kewaunee, Brown	January 3, 1995	January 3, 2001	
Garey Bies	Rep.	Sister Bay	Door, Kewaunee, Brown	January 3, 2001	January 3, 2015	
Garey Bies	Rep.	Sister Bay	Door, Kewaunee, Brown, Manitowoc	January 3, 2001	January 3, 2015	
Joel Kitchens	Rep.	Sturgeon Bay	Door, Kewaunee, Brown, Manitowoc	January 6, 2015	Current	
Joel Kitchens	Rep.	Sturgeon Bay	Door, Kewaunee, Brown	January 6, 2015	Current	

== Electoral history ==
Year	Date	Elected				Defeated				Total	Plurality	Other primary candidates
1972	Nov. 7	Lary J. Swoboda	Democratic	12,704	62.38%	Lawrence H. Johnson	Rep.	7,367	36.17%	20,365	5,337	
1972	Nov. 7	Lary J. Swoboda	Democratic	12,704	62.38%	Richard M. Vanden Heuvel	Amer.	294	1.44%	20,365	5,337	
1974	Nov. 5	Lary J. Swoboda (inc)	Democratic	9,867	63.85%	Cheryl R. Warren	Rep.	5,338	34.54%	15,453	4,529	
1974	Nov. 5	Lary J. Swoboda (inc)	Democratic	9,867	63.85%	Kenneth Werkheiser	Amer.	248	1.60%	15,453	4,529	
1976	Nov. 2	Lary J. Swoboda (inc)	Democratic	16,670	74.30%	Herman V. Nelson	Rep.	5,766	25.70%	22,436	10,904	Lynn B. Engebose (Rep.)
1978	Nov. 7	Lary J. Swoboda (inc)	Democratic	11,234	65.73%	Harvey W. Rowe	Rep.	5,858	34.27%	17,092	5,376	Milton A. Hafeman (Rep.); Ruth A. Gunnerson (Rep.)
1980	Nov. 4	Lary J. Swoboda (inc)	Democratic	18,140	71.98%	Clifford Delorit	Rep.	7,060	28.02%	25,200	11,080	
1982	Nov. 2	Louise M. Tesmer	Democratic	13,103	83.95%	William A. Rinnemaki	Rep.	2,223	14.24%	16,236	1,230	Phillip J. Tuczynski (Dem.)
1982	Nov. 2	Louise M. Tesmer	Democratic	13,103	83.95%	Elaine Bergstrom	Lib.	282	1.81%	16,236	1,230	Phillip J. Tuczynski (Dem.)
1984	Nov. 6	Lary J. Swoboda	Democratic	15,651	68.64%	Frank J. Schnabl	Rep.	7,149	31.36%	22,800	8,502	Linda Neeck (Rep.)
1986	Nov. 4	Lary J. Swoboda (inc)	Democratic	11,018	67.98%	Frank J. Schnabl	Rep.	4,874	30.07%	16,208	6,144	
1986	Nov. 4	Lary J. Swoboda (inc)	Democratic	11,018	67.98%	Marjorie Otto Wessely	Ind.	316	1.95%	16,208	6,144	
1988	Nov. 8	Lary J. Swoboda (inc)	Democratic	13,278	56.77%	Robert Papke	Rep.	10,112	43.23%	23,390	3,166	
1990	Nov. 6	Lary J. Swoboda (inc)	Democratic	11,068	64.60%	Clifford Ehlers	Rep.	6,066	35.40%	17,134	5,002	
1992	Nov. 3	Lary J. Swoboda (inc)	Democratic	21,597	100.0%					21,597	21,597	
1994	Nov. 8	David E. Hutchison	Republican	10,872	61.63%	Colleen Crocker-MacMillin	Dem.	6,769	38.37%	17,641	4,103	Darrel Graf (Rep.); James H. Grasse (Rep.); Monika A. Wulfers (Dem.)
1996	Nov. 5	David E. Hutchison (inc)	Republican	17,593	99.95%	N. Vandervest (write-in)	Lib.	9	0.05%	17,602	17,584	
1998	Nov. 3	David E. Hutchison (inc)	Republican	14,864	100.0%					14,864	14,864	
2000	Nov. 7	Garey Bies	Republican	16,132	57.09%	Lary J. Swoboda	Dem.	12,104	42.84%	28,255	4,028	Peter J. Andre (Rep.)
2002	Nov. 5	Garey Bies (inc)	Republican	13,378	65.58%	Tom Hermann	Dem.	7,011	34.37%	20,401	6,367	Peter J. Andre (Rep.)
2004	Nov. 2	Garey Bies (inc)	Republican	19,022	61.48%	Tom Hermann	Dem.	11,890	38.43%	30,938	7,132	
2006	Nov. 7	Garey Bies (inc)	Republican	13,736	53.56%	Ame Grail	Dem.	11,888	46.35%	25,647	1,848	
2008	Nov. 4	Garey Bies (inc)	Republican	15,905	51.33%	Richard A. Skare	Dem.	15,055	48.59%	30,985	850	Christopher Baeb (Dem.)
2010	Nov. 2	Garey Bies (inc)	Republican	14,225	58.29%	Richard A. Skare	Dem.	10,165	41.65%	24,405	4,060	
2012	Nov. 6	Garey Bies (inc)	Republican	16,993	51.27%	Patrick Veeser	Dem.	16,124	48.65%	33,146	869	Arnie Johnsurd (Dem.)
2014	Nov. 4	Joel Kitchens	Republican	16,072	56.70%	Joe Majeski	Dem.	12,256	43.24%	28,345	3,816	Terry McNulty (Rep.); Brian Hackbarth (Rep.); Paul M. Feit (Rep.)
2016	Nov. 8	Joel Kitchens (inc)	Republican	20,044	60.11%	Lynn Utesch	Dem.	13,289	39.85%	33,347	6,755	
2018	Nov. 6	Joel Kitchens (inc)	Republican	20,651	68.45%	Roberta Thelen	Ind.	9,519	31.55%	30,170	11,132	
2020	Nov. 3	Joel Kitchens (inc)	Republican	23,441	61.82%	Kim Delorit Jensen	Dem.	14,462	38.14%	37,920	8,979	
2022	Nov. 3	Joel Kitchens (inc)	Republican	19,864	62.45%	Roberta Thelen	Dem.	11,916	37.46%	31,806	7,948	
2024	Nov. 3	Joel Kitchens (inc)	Republican	24,101	61.91%	Renee Paplham	Dem.	14,801	38.02%	38,929	9,300	Milt Swagel (Rep.)
