= Nick Milroy =

American politician (born 1974)

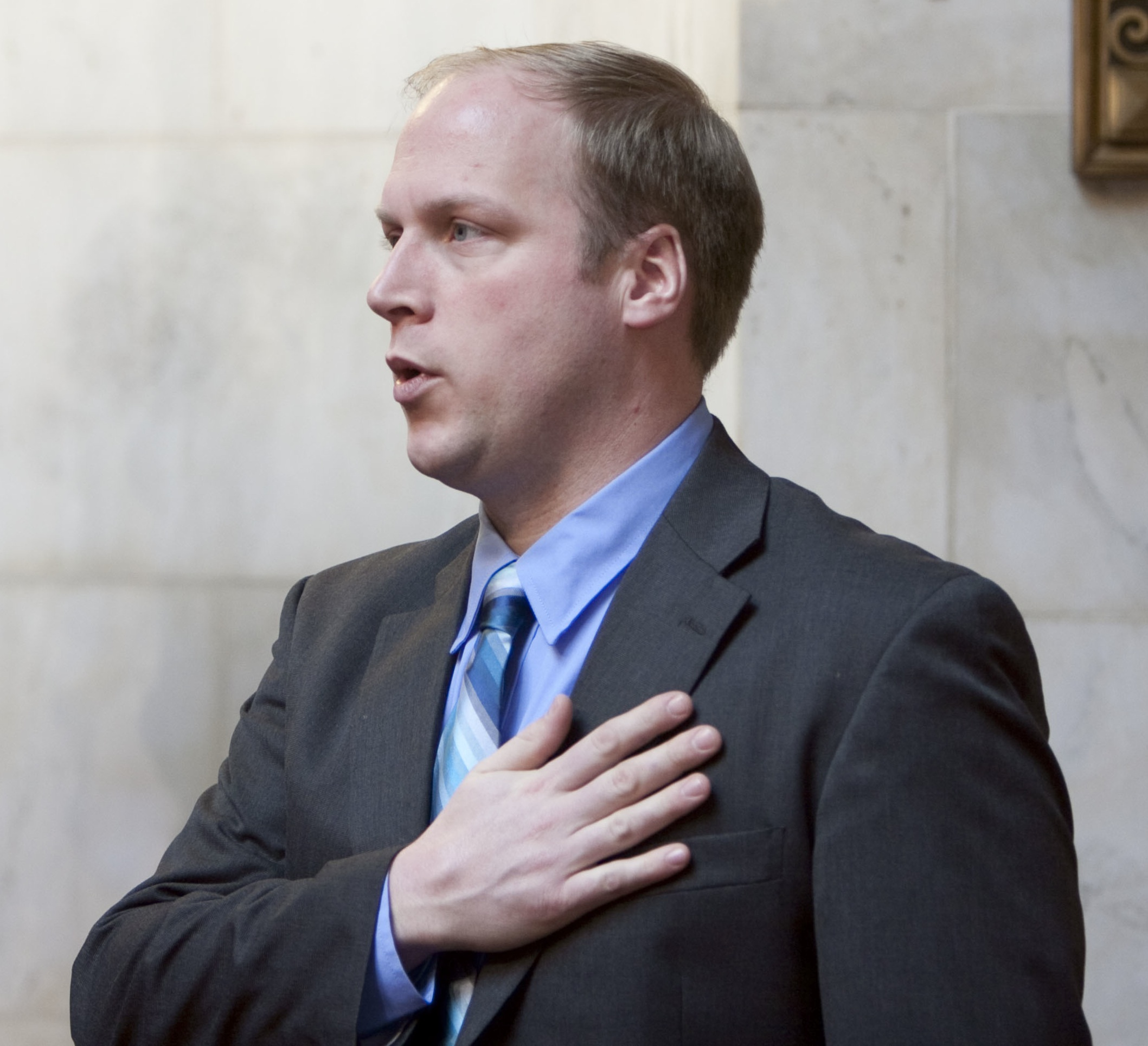
- Milroy in 2009

Member of the Wisconsin State Assembly from the 73rd district
- In office January 5, 2009 – January 2, 2023
- Preceded by: Frank Boyle
- Succeeded by: Angie Sapik

Personal details
- Born: April 15, 1974 (age 52) Duluth, Minnesota, U.S.
- Party: Democratic
- Education: University of Wisconsin–Superior
- Profession: Biologist

Military service
- Allegiance: United States
- Branch/service: United States Navy; United States Navy Reserve
- Years of service: 1992–1994 (USN); 1994–2000 (USNR)
- Battles/wars: Operation Southern Watch

Nick Milroy (born April 15, 1974) is an American fisheries biologist and Democratic politician from Superior, Wisconsin. He was a member of the Wisconsin State Assembly for seven terms, representing the 73rd Assembly district from 2009 through 2023.

== Biography ==
Nick Milroy was born in Duluth, Minnesota and raised in Superior, Wisconsin. His parents were public school teachers and local small business owners. Nick's wife, Julie, is also a public school teacher. The couple are parents to two sons, Maverik and MacLane, and a daughter, Marleigh.

Immediately after graduation from Superior Senior High School, Nick enlisted in the United States Navy where he deployed to the Persian Gulf in support of Operation Southern Watch. Upon his return, he continued to serve in the Navy Reserve while pursuing his biology degree at the University of Wisconsin–Superior and also attended University of Wisconsin–Eau Claire. He later taught biology at the University of Wisconsin–Eau Claire. He also served on the Superior Common Council.

He was appointed to a regional board to reduce mercury pollution in the St. Louis River watershed and formerly served as an international representative on the Lake Superior Binational Forum. He has also worked as a biologist for state, federal, and tribal agencies. Milroy is currently serving his second term where he is dedicated to supporting working families and providing a voice for those who might otherwise go unheard.

As a legislator, Milroy uses his extensive biology and natural resource expertise as a member of the Committees on Natural Resources, Forestry, and Veterans and Military Affairs in the Wisconsin State Assembly.

Milroy is listed in the Freshwater Fishing Hall of Fame. In 1989 while ice fishing on Lake Superior, he caught a 24" Steelhead.

== Capitol Incident ==
On March 3, 2011, Milroy was tackled by law enforcement officers while attempting to enter the Capitol during the emotionally charged 2011 Wisconsin protests to retrieve clothing. He said in a statement that "no harm was done", but criticized the "armed-palace environment created by Gov. Scott Walker".

Wisconsin State Assembly
Preceded by Frank Boyle	Member of the Wisconsin State Assembly from the 73rd district January 5, 2009 – January 2, 2023	Succeeded by Angie Sapik
