= Frank Boyle =

American politician (born 1945)

Member of the Wisconsin State Assembly from the 73rd district
- In office January 5, 1987 – January 5, 2009
- Preceded by: Robert Jauch
- Succeeded by: Nick Milroy

Personal details
- Born: February 20, 1945 (age 81) Phillips, Wisconsin, U.S.
- Party: Democratic
- Spouse: Katie Boyle
- Education: University of Wisconsin–Superior
- Occupation: former building contractor

Frank Boyle (born February 20, 1945) is an American retired Democratic politician. He served as a member of the Wisconsin State Assembly from 1987 to 2009, representing the far northwest corner of the state.

== Early life and education ==
Born in Phillips, Wisconsin, Boyle graduated from Phillips High School. He received his bachelor's degree from University of Wisconsin–Superior and did graduate work there and at University of Wisconsin–Madison.

== Career ==
Prior to entering politics, Boyle was a building contractor. He also served on the Douglas County, Wisconsin Board of Supervisors. He served as a Democratic Party member of the Wisconsin State Assembly, representing the 73rd Assembly District from 1986 to 2008, when he retired. He was succeeded by Nick Milroy who he endorsed.
