= Adler Graduate School =

Private graduate school in United States

Coordinates: 44°53′35.9052″N 93°24′6.4572″W

Adler Graduate School is a private graduate school in Minnetonka, Minnesota, that offers a various Master of Arts degrees and advanced certificates rooted in Adlerian Psychology. It is accredited by the Higher Learning Commission as well as being CACREP accredited.

The Minnesota-based Adler Graduate School (AGS), the Chicago-based Adler University (AU), and the Adler Graduate Professional School (AGPS) based in Toronto, Canada, are all independent of one another and institutionally unaffiliated.

== See also ==
- List of colleges and universities in Minnesota
- Higher education in Minnesota
