= Duluth Business University =

Coordinates: 46°44′30″N 92°9′27″W

Duluth Business University (DBU) was a private for-profit college in Duluth, Minnesota that closed in June 2018. At its peak it enrolled about 300 students and was the oldest college in Duluth, Minnesota. DBU closed in June 2018 because its accreditor had its authority revoked by the U.S. Department of Education which has caused enrollment problems for the institution.

== History ==
Founded in 1891, in Duluth, Minnesota, the privately owned and operated school was focused on career-specific training. In May 1994, DBU obtained degree-granting status from the state of Minnesota and offers an associate degree in Applied Sciences and two Bachelor of Science degrees.

In April 2003, DBU moved to a different 27,500 sq ft (2,550 m^{2}) facility, and added training for health fields as well as on-line education options.

On July 19, 2017, Duluth Business University announced that it will close in June 2018.

== Alumni ==
- William L. McKnight - former chairman of 3M corporation

== Affiliations ==
Duluth Business University was a part of the Globe Education Network, educational affiliates include:

- Globe University/Minnesota School of Business
- Broadview University
- Minnesota School of Cosmetology
