= White Earth Tribal and Community College =

Community college in Minnesota, US

- Gaawaabaabiganikaag Gabegikendaasowigamig
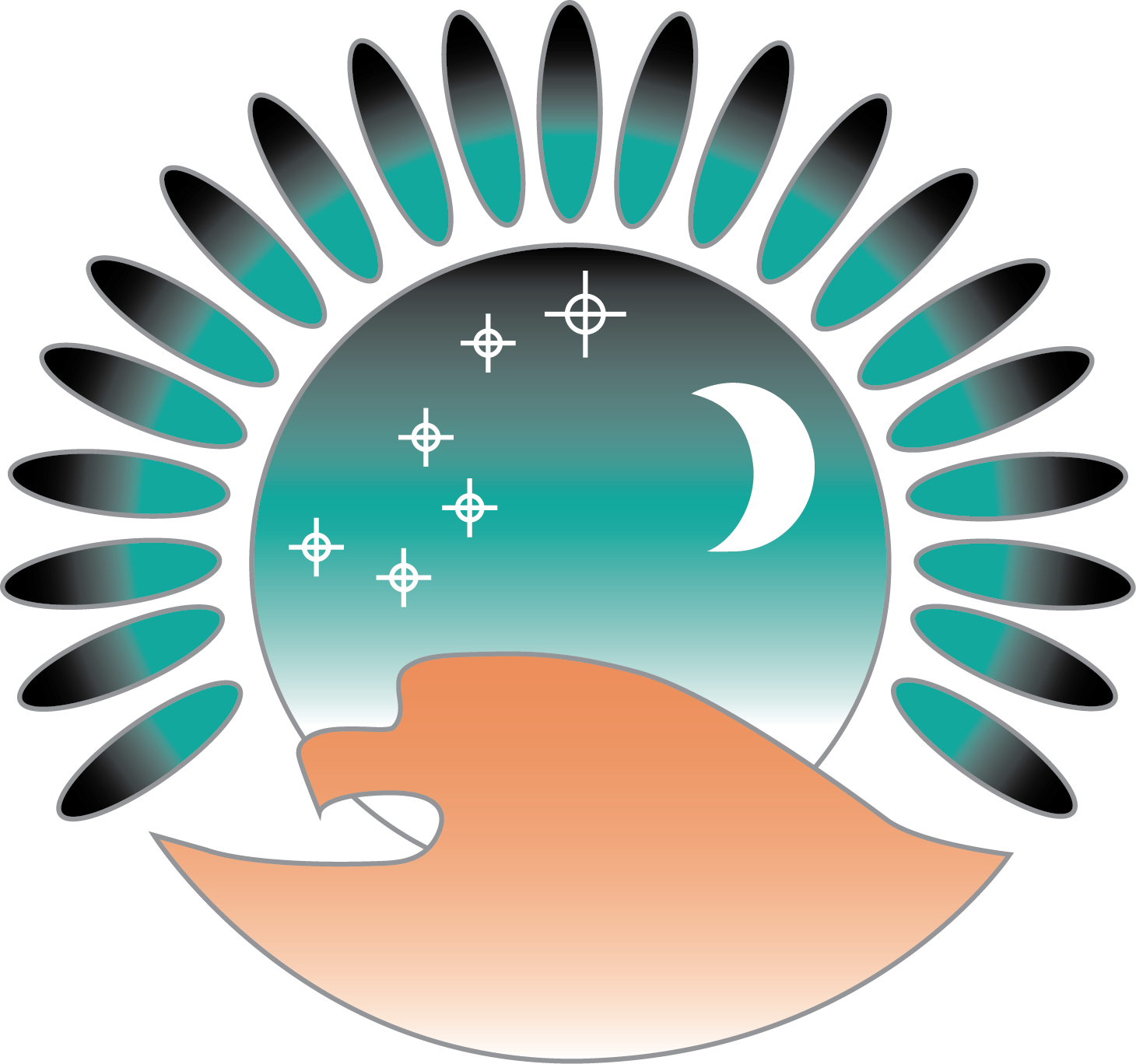
- Type: Private tribal land-grant community college
- Established: 1997
- Academic affiliations: American Indian Higher Education Consortium
- President: Lorna LaGue
- Students: 140
- Location: Mahnomen, Minnesota, United States; 47°19′2″N 95°57′11″W
- Campus: Indian reservation
- Website: www.wetcc.edu

White Earth Tribal and Community College (WETCC) is a private tribal land-grant community college in Mahnomen, Minnesota. It was established by the White Earth Reservation Tribal Council in 1997.

== Academics ==
WETCC is accredited by the Higher Learning Commission (HLC) and provides an Associate of Arts degree program.

== Partnerships ==
The college is a member of the American Indian Higher Education Consortium, which is a community of tribally and federally chartered institutions working to strengthen tribal nations and make a lasting difference in the lives of American Indians and Alaska Natives. WETCC was created in response to the higher education needs of American Indians. WETCC generally serves geographically isolated populations that have no other means of accessing education beyond the high school level.

== Student life ==
Undergraduate demographics as of Fall 2023
Race and ethnicity	Total
American Indian/Alaska Native	80%
White	12%
Hispanic	4%
Two or more races	3%
Unknown	1%
Economic diversity
Low-income (Note: The percentage of students who received an income-based federal Pell grant intended for low-income students.)	82%
Affluent (Note: The percentage of students who are a part of the American middle class at the bare minimum.)	18%

== See also ==
- American Indian College Fund (AICF)

== Gallery ==
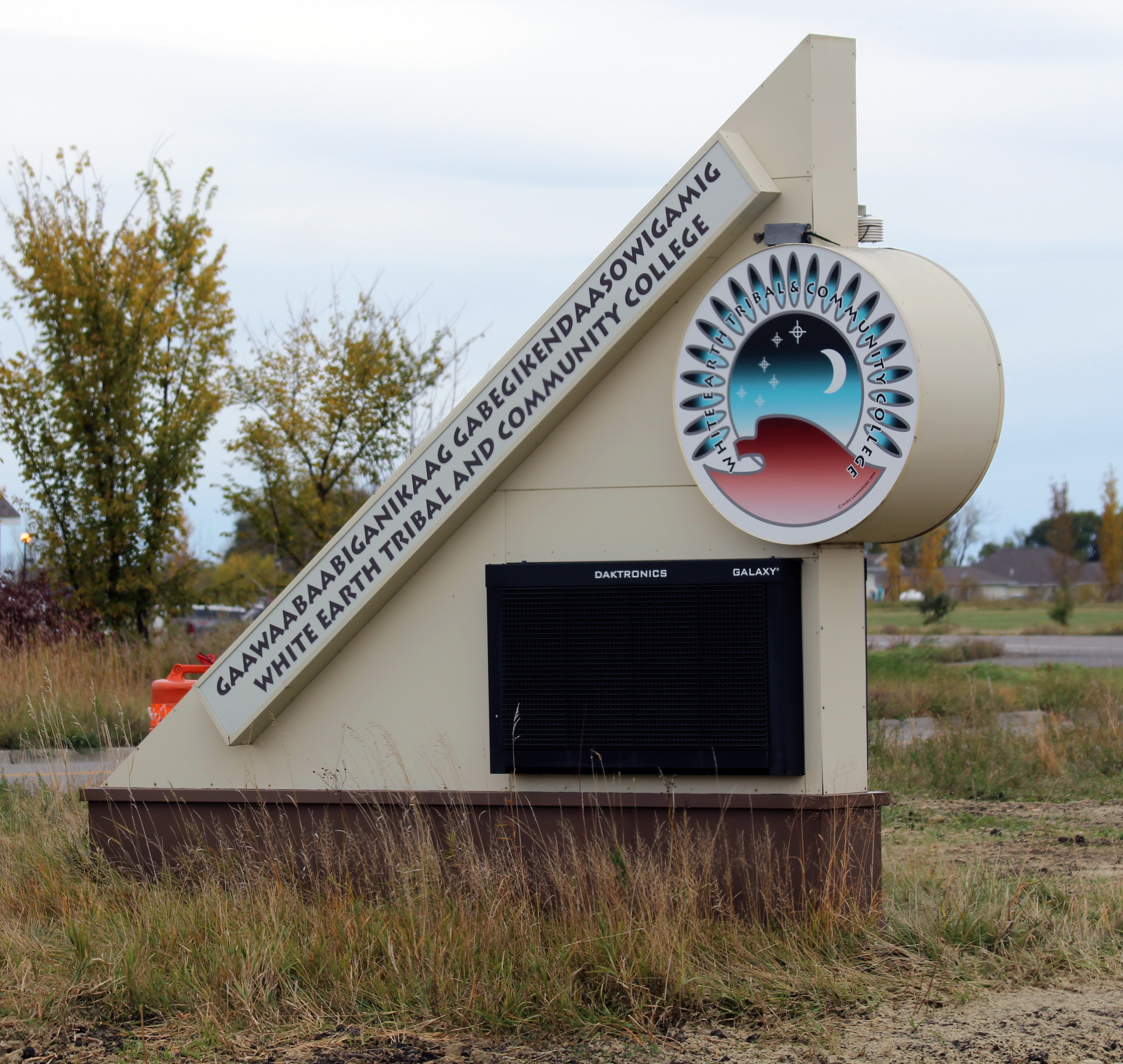
Sign at entrance

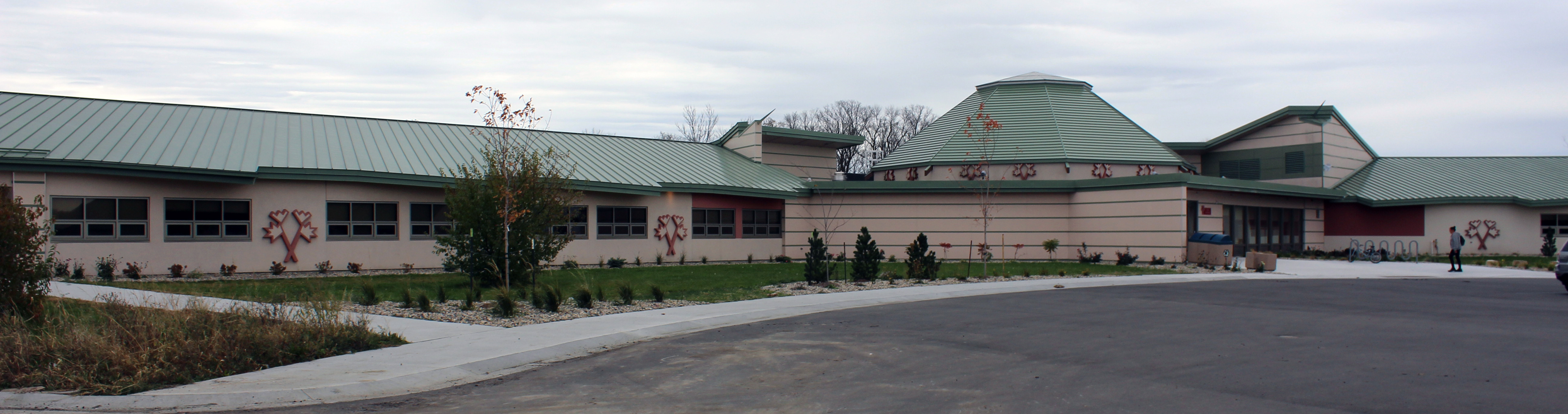
North wing

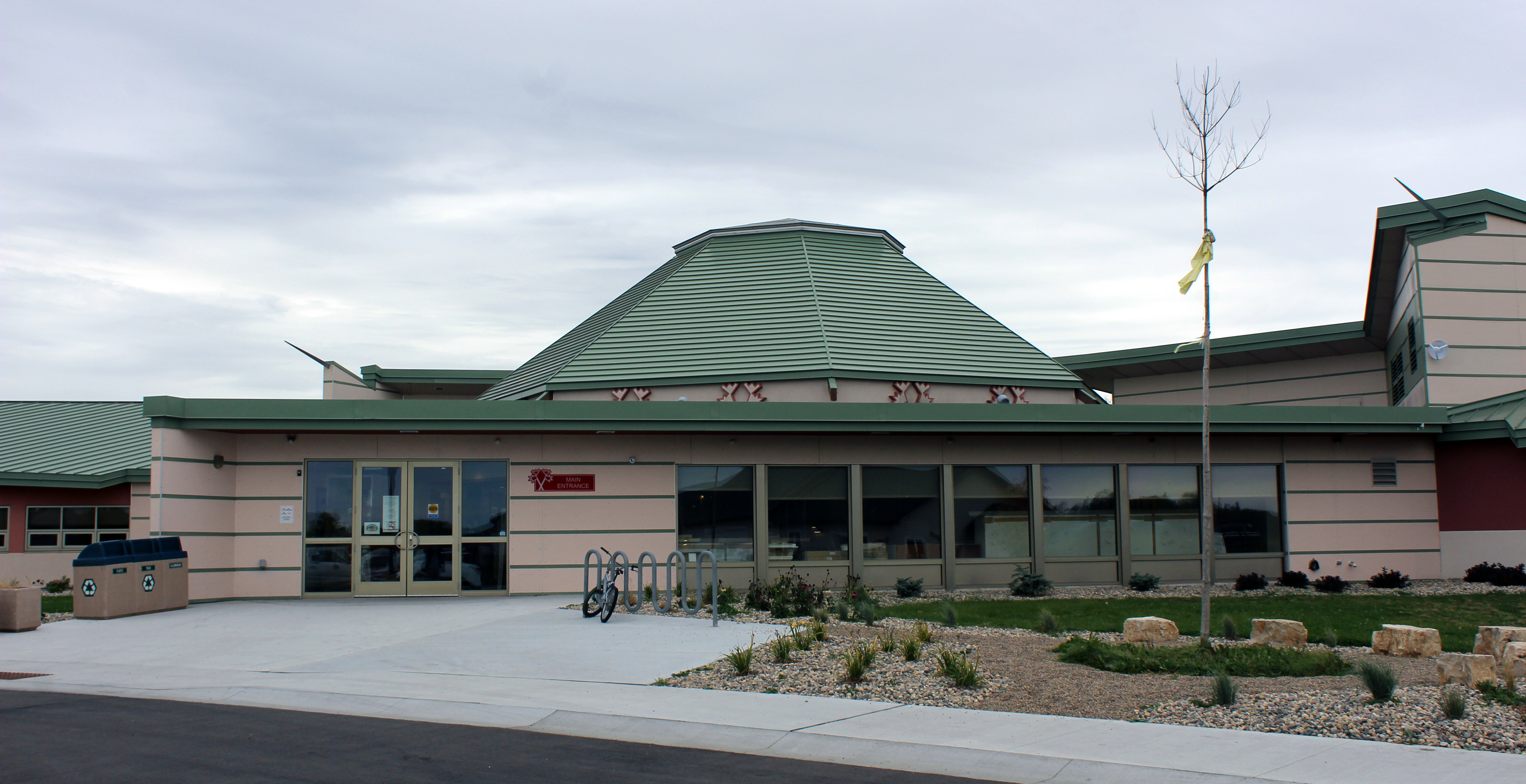
Drum hall dome and entrance

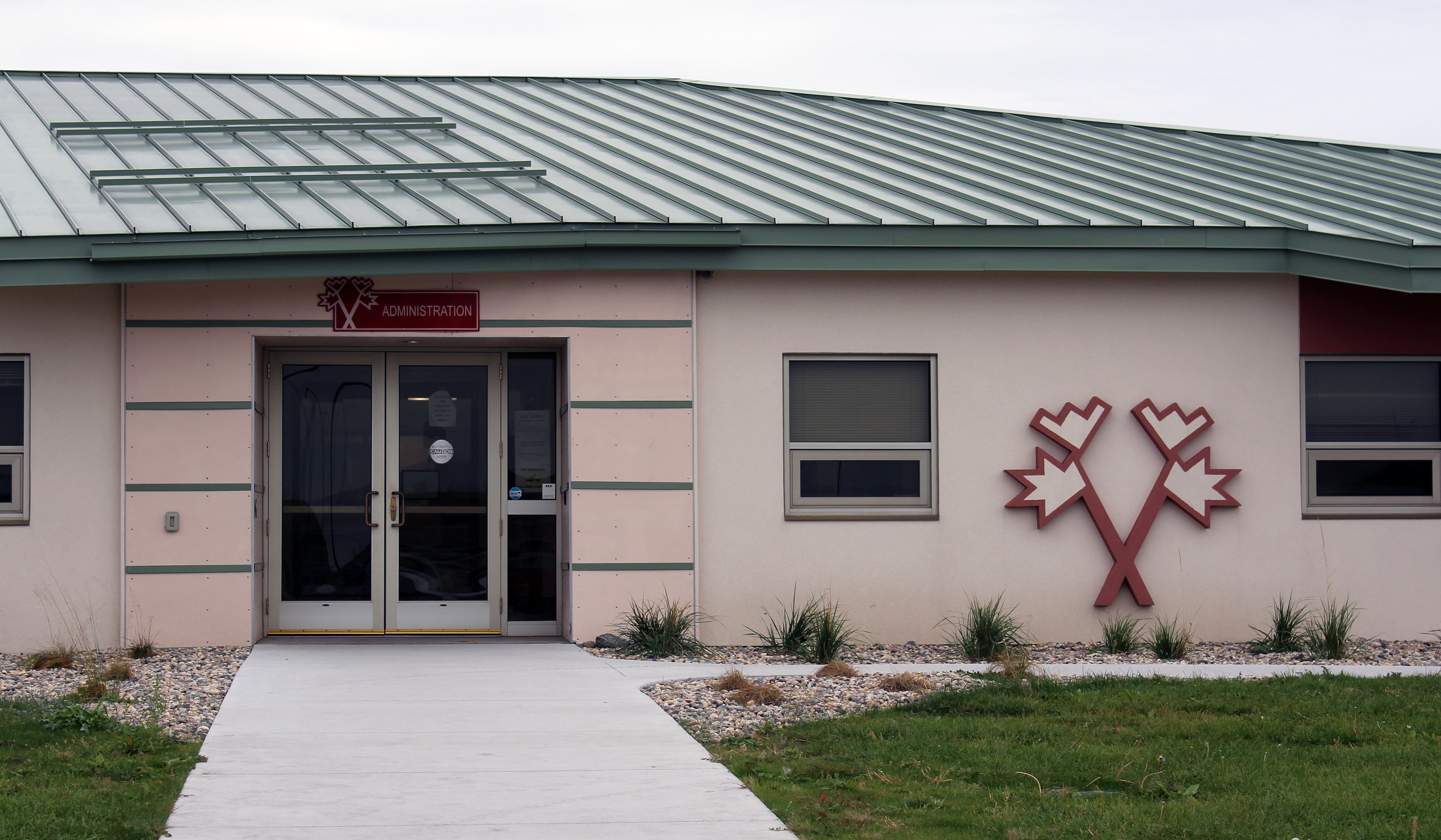
Entrance to Administration

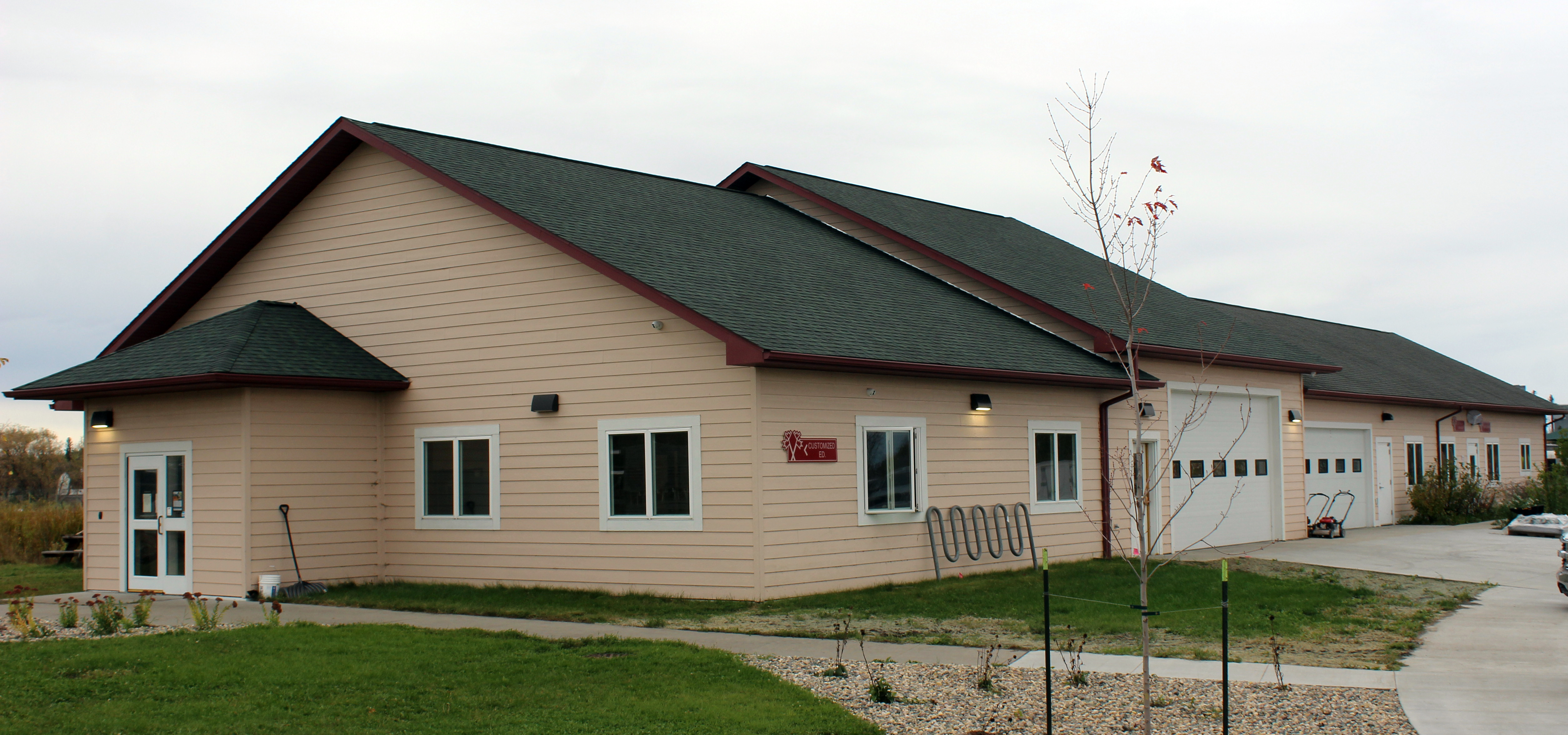
Customized Education building
