= University of Minnesota Rochester =

Public university in Rochester, Minnesota

- Type: Public college
- Established: 2006
- Parent institution: University of Minnesota system
- Chancellor: Lori Carrell
- Undergraduates: 632 (2021)
- Location: Rochester, Minnesota, United States; 44°01′21″N 92°27′49″W
- Campus: Urban
- Colors: Maroon and gold
- Mascot: Rockie the Raptor
- Website: www.r.umn.edu

The University of Minnesota Rochester (UMR) is a public college in Rochester, Minnesota, United States. It is part of the University of Minnesota system and focuses primarily on general health sciences. It was formally established by an act of the state legislature in December 2006. UMR currently offers two bachelor's degrees in the health sciences, Bachelor of Science in Health Sciences and Bachelor of Science in Health Professions.

== History ==
Rochester legislators and community advocates started the campaign to increase higher education in the local area as early as the 1950s. Courses were offered in engineering, education, and math starting in 1966 as a satellite site of the University of Minnesota in coordination with other institutions.

In the early 1990s, an educational coalition was formed with Rochester Community and Technical College and Winona State University Rochester to form the University Center Rochester – three institutions, two systems, and one campus.

In 1998, Rochester was identified by the legislature as a future branch of the University of Minnesota system. This designation allowed the Rochester site to develop its own leadership structure and to begin to develop its own academic program independent of other campuses.

In 2000, the university heightened efforts to grow both the graduate satellite programs of the Rochester branch by adding a new provost to lead the campus and staff to accommodate this growth.

The current University of Minnesota Rochester began to take form in January 2005 when then-Governor Tim Pawlenty announced in his State of the State address that southeastern Minnesota was underserved by public higher education and announced a plan to initiate research into solving the problem. The governor formed the Rochester Higher Education Development Committee (RHEDC) and appointed local business owner Marilyn Stewart to lead the group. The committee consisted of representatives from other public and private education institutions, area business leaders, and leaders in health care. The group's charge was to formulate a plan to advance higher education in the Rochester area.

The RHEDC eventually identified the need for a branch campus of the University of Minnesota system that could integrate with the health sciences programs and needs of the Mayo Clinic. The RHEDC report was drafted and delivered to the legislature and the governor. The recommendations of the report were adopted by the governor, the legislature, and the University of Minnesota Board of Regents. Controversially, this establishment represented a change in collegiate policy by establishing an additional University of Minnesota branch campus in spite of the prior policy that stated it was the role of the Minnesota State system to provide programming for Greater Minnesota.

In 2006, the University of Minnesota Rochester was approved as a branch campus by the Board of Regents, and shortly after, selection of existing space in the former downtown mall allowed for the future siting of the campus. Staff were appointed to start the health sciences undergraduate program.

In the fall of 2007, UMR staff moved into the renovated facilities at the newly renamed University Square in downtown Rochester and welcomed its new Chancellor, Dr. Stephen Lehmkuhle. He was inaugurated in April 2008 with a community celebration and formal address.

In September 2010, UMR chose Rockie the Raptor as their mascot, and took on the maroon and gold colors of the university system.

In fall of 2011, UMR added the Bachelor of Science in Health Professions (BSHP) degree program, which is delivered in educational collaboration with the Mayo Clinic School of Health Sciences. Students in the BSHP program graduate with a degree from UMR and a certificate from the Mayo Clinic School of Health Sciences in one of four health-related fields: Respiratory Care, Echocardiography, Sonography, and Radiography.

On May 18, 2013, UMR graduated its first class of undergraduate students in the Bachelor of Science in Health Sciences and Bachelor of Science in Health Professions programs at the Mayo Civic Center in downtown Rochester.

== Student enrollment and graduation ==
Total UMR enrollment trended upward from 2009 through 2013. In 2009 UMR admitted only first-year students. Beginning in the fall of 2012, courses were available for first-year, sophomore, junior, and senior undergraduate students.

UMR's overall enrollment trajectory has been consistently upward from Fall 2016 to Fall 2020. According to the UM official enrollment information in fall 2016, 424 degree-seeking undergraduates were enrolled at UMR, while in fall 2020, there were 614 degree-seeking undergraduates, representing a nearly 45% increase.

739 students had graduated from UMR as of the end of the 2019–2020 academic year. On May 18, 2013, UMR graduated its first class of 49 undergraduate students in the B.S. in Health Sciences and B.S. in Health Professions programs at the Mayo Civic Center in downtown Rochester. 73 students graduated the following year, an additional 109 graduating during the 2014–2015 academic year, and another 109 walked across the stage on May 15, 2016.

== On-campus housing ==
UMR offers three on-campus housing options: 318 Commons, Residence at Discovery Square, and Student Life Center as of fall 2023. Because 318 Commons is designated as on-campus, UMR sets the rental rate, and the student pays the institution along with tuition, fees, and other expenses. UMR has a meal plan with the opening of the Student Life Center as of fall 2023. Residence at Discovery Square is another upperclassmen housing option along with 318 Commons, and is also apartment style living. The Student Life Center is housing available for incoming students and sophomores.

== See also ==
- List of colleges and universities in Minnesota
- Higher education in Minnesota
