= Lary J. Swoboda =

American politician

Member of the Wisconsin State Assembly
- In office January 7, 1985 – January 3, 1995
- Preceded by: Louise M. Tesmer
- Succeeded by: David E. Hutchison
- Constituency: 1st Assembly district
- In office January 3, 1983 – January 7, 1985
- Preceded by: Thomas B. Murray
- Succeeded by: Robert Jauch
- Constituency: 73rd Assembly district
- In office January 1, 1973 – January 3, 1983
- Preceded by: District established
- Succeeded by: Louise M. Tesmer
- Constituency: 1st Assembly district
- In office January 4, 1971 – January 1, 1973
- Preceded by: Lawrence H. Johnson
- Succeeded by: District abolished
- Constituency: Door–Kewaunee district

Personal details
- Born: May 28, 1939 Luxemburg, Wisconsin, U.S.
- Died: November 25, 2012 (aged 73) Luxemburg, Wisconsin, U.S.
- Resting place: Saint Mary's Cemetery; Luxemburg, Wisconsin
- Party: Democratic
- Spouse: Janice M. Hendricks (m. 1968–2012)
- Children: None
- Education: University of Wisconsin–Milwaukee (B.S., M.S.)
- Profession: Teacher, politician

Lary J. Swoboda, Ph.D. (May 28, 1939 – November 25, 2012) was an American educator and Democratic politician. He served 24 years in the Wisconsin State Assembly, representing Door and Kewaunee counties.

== Biography ==
Swoboda was born in Luxemburg, Wisconsin, in 1939. A Roman Catholic, he was a member of the Society of the Holy Name and the Knights of Columbus. He received his bachelor's and master's degrees from University of Wisconsin–Milwaukee and became a schoolteacher in the Southern Door School system.

== Family ==
Swoboda was born to Joseph and Catherine (née Daul) Swoboda. On November 16, 1968, he married Janice M. Hendricks in Green Bay.

== Political career ==
Swoboda was a Democratic member of the Assembly from 1971 to his retirement in 1994 (at which time he was the longest-serving member of the Assembly). After leaving public office, Swoboda was state director of Americorps. He received his doctorate and became a school administrator. In 2000, he sought election to the Wisconsin State Assembly and was defeated.

== Death ==
Lary Swoboda died on November 25, 2012, aged 73, from a heart attack.
