= Minnesota School of Cosmetology =

The Minnesota School of Cosmetology is a for-profit cosmetology school with one location in the Minneapolis/Saint Paul metro, The campus is located in Woodbury, Minnesota. The school offers a complete 1550-hour course in cosmetology, a 600-hour course in esthiology, a 500-hour course in massage therapy, and a 38-hour instructor course. A secondary location was located in Plymouth, Minnesota from 2012 to 2020.

== History ==
Minnesota Cosmetology Education Center was established in 1950, in a residential home that was converted to a school setting. In 1988, new owners purchased the school, and revamped the curriculum to focus on the salon industry; taking on the education of the business side of cosmetology. Curriculum focuses on cosmetology, sales training, communication, fashion, and technical ability.

In 2003, Minnesota Cosmetology Education Center was acquired by Terry L. Myhre and Kaye Myhre, who renamed the institution Minnesota School of Cosmetology, and moved the facility from South Saint Paul to a location in Oakdale, a suburb of St. Paul Minnesota. The campus has since moved to the nearby suburb of Woodbury, Minnesota. In 2012, an additional campus opened in the suburb of Plymouth, Minnesota. Due to financial strain in part brought on by the COVID-19 pandemic, the Plymouth campus closed on December, 30th, 2020.

== Accreditation ==
The Minnesota School of Cosmetology is nationally accredited by National Accrediting Commission of Cosmetology Arts and Sciences (NACCAS).

NACCAS is recognized by the United States Department of Education as a national accrediting agency for cosmetology schools.

The state agency that licenses the institution is the Minnesota Board of Cosmetology. And is also recognized by the BBB of Minnesota receiving an A.

== Affiliations ==
The Minnesota School of Cosmetology currently lists its educational affiliates on their website as:

- United States Department of Education
- Veterans Education and Training by the Minnesota Department of Education State Approving Agency

They are part of the Broadview Education Consortium which is owned by Terry Myhre and his family, who had previously owned the Globe Education Network:

- MAP/Muscle Activation Techniques
- The Institute for Production and Recording
- Broadview University
