= Gingles, Wisconsin =

- Town
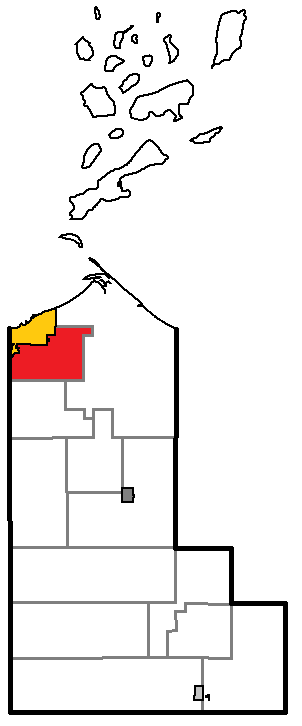
- Location of Gingles, within Ashland County, Wisconsin
- Coordinates: 46°32′34″N 90°50′48″W
- Country: United States
- State: Wisconsin
- County: Ashland
- Founded: March 22, 1924

Area
  - Total: 38.94 sq mi (100.86 km^{2})
  - Land: 38.94 sq mi (100.85 km^{2})
  - Water: 0.0077 sq mi (0.02 km^{2})
- Elevation: 702 ft (214 m)

Population (2020)
  - Total: 738
  - Density: 19.0/sq mi (7.32/km^{2})
- Time zone: UTC-6 (Central (CST))
  - Summer (DST): UTC-5 (CDT)
- Area codes: 715 & 534
- FIPS code: 55-29250
- GNIS feature ID: 1583278
- Website: https://townofgingles.org/

Gingles is a town in Ashland County in the U.S. state of Wisconsin. The population was 738 at the 2020 census. The unincorporated community of White River is located in the town.

== History ==
On March 22, 1924, the town of Gingles was created. The town was named for Alexander Gingles, who came from Ireland to settle in Ashland County in the 1890s.

== Geography ==
Gingles is located in northern Ashland County and is bordered by the city of Ashland to the north. According to the United States Census Bureau, Gingles has a total area of 39.0 square miles (101.0 km^{2}), of which 0.008 square miles (0.02 km^{2}), or 0.01%, is water.

== Demographics ==
Historical population
Census	Pop.	Note	%±
1930	424		—
1940	442		4.2%
1950	473		7.0%
1960	417		−11.8%
1970	456		9.4%
1980	545		19.5%
1990	492		−9.7%
2000	640		30.1%
2010	778		21.6%
2020	738		−5.1%
U.S. Decennial Census

As of the census of 2000, there were 640 people, 237 households, and 186 families residing in the town. The population density was 16.4 people per square mile (6.3/km^{2}). There were 273 housing units at an average density of 7.0 per square mile (2.7/km^{2}). The racial makeup of the town was 92.34% White, 6.25% Native American, and 1.41% from two or more races. Hispanic or Latino of any race were 0.47% of the population.

There were 237 households, out of which 37.1% had children under the age of 18 living with them, 68.8% were married couples living together, 5.9% had a female householder with no husband present, and 21.1% were non-families. 16.5% of all households were made up of individuals, and 3.8% had someone living alone who was 65 years of age or older. The average household size was 2.70 and the average family size was 3.06.

In the town, the population was spread out, with 30.3% under the age of 18, 4.2% from 18 to 24, 30.8% from 25 to 44, 26.6% from 45 to 64, and 8.1% who were 65 years of age or older. The median age was 36 years. For every 100 females, there were 103.8 males. For every 100 females age 18 and over, there were 103.7 males.

The median income for a household in the town was $42,188, and the median income for a family was $43,750. Males had a median income of $32,500 versus $21,111 for females. The per capita income for the town was $16,085. About 7.7% of families and 6.7% of the population were below the poverty line, including 3.2% of those under age 18 and 21.7% of those age 65 or over.
