= Broadview College =

Private college in West Jordan, Utah, United States

Coordinates: 40°36′37″N 111°56′29″W

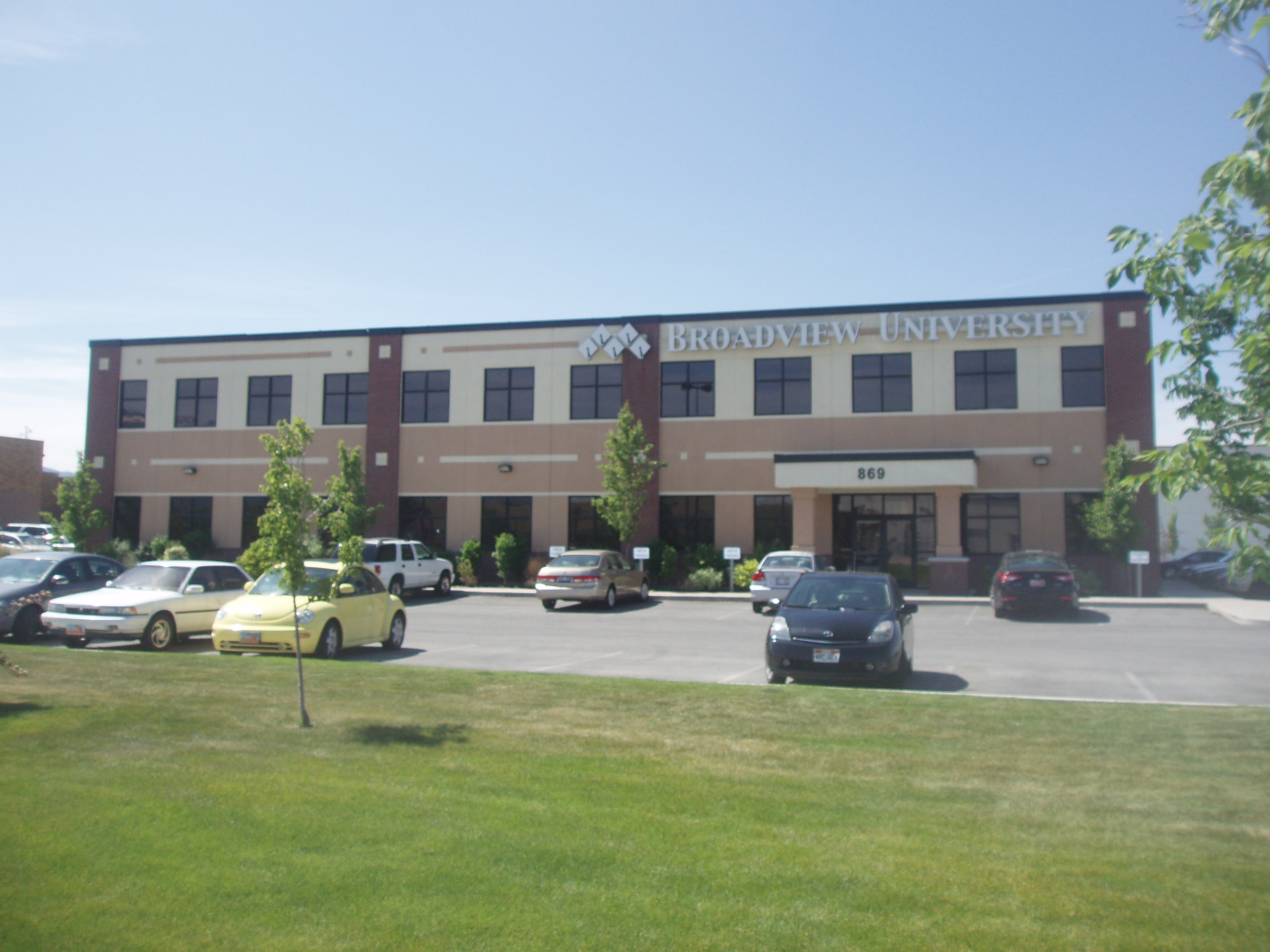
- Motto: Successful Futures Start Here!
- Type: Private for-profit college
- Active: 1977–2024
- Students: 268
- Location: West Jordan, Utah, United States

Broadview College, formerly Utah Career College, was a private for-profit college in West Jordan, Utah. It primarily awarded associate degrees and ceased operations in 2024.

== History ==
The college was originally founded as The Bryman School in 1977. Located in Salt Lake City, the school's enrollment consisted of only 17 students. In 1988, a new campus was constructed in Salt Lake City Valley.

In 1996, the school began offering associate of applied science degrees.

By October 2000, the school was now known as Utah Career College and moved to its current location in West Jordan, Utah. In 2006, the school began offering bachelor of science degrees. In 2007, UCC opened a branch campus in Layton. In 2008, it opened a campus in Orem and began offering fully online programs through its West Jordan campus.

In 2010, Utah Career College changed its name to Broadview University and began offering its first graduate degree, a Master of Science in Management with emphases in Information Technology, Health Care Management and Management Leadership.

The institution was granted permission to award associate of applied science degrees in 1996, bachelor of science degrees in 2006, and bachelor of fine arts degrees, Master of Science in Management degrees and Master of Business Administration degrees in 2010.

In 2011, the Salt Lake campus became Broadview Entertainment Arts University (BEAU), focusing exclusively on entertainment arts and adding additional programs.

In 2015, Broadview closed its Orem campus.

In 2018, Broadview Entertainment Arts University (BEAU) closed its campus.

In 2024, Broadview College ceased operations.
