= John Thomas Mackall =

US Army soldier (1920–1942)

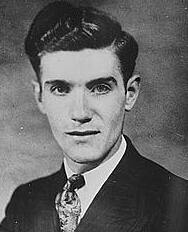
- Private John Thomas Mackall c. 1940s
- Born: May 17, 1920; Negley, Ohio, U.S.
- Died: November 12, 1942 (aged 22); Gibraltar
- Burial place: Glenview Cemetery; East Palestine, Ohio, U.S.
- Military career
- Allegiance: United States
- Branch: United States Army
- Service years: 1942
- Rank: Private
- Nickname: Tommy
- Service number: 35-281-555
- Unit: 509th Infantry Regiment
- Conflicts: World War II: Operation Torch
- Awards: Purple Heart

John Thomas "Tommy" Mackall (May 17, 1920 – November 12, 1942) was a United States Army paratrooper during World War II who was killed in action during Operation Torch, the U.S. Army's first major airborne operation. He is recorded as one of the first American paratrooper casualties of the war. Since 1943, he has been the namesake of Camp Mackall.

== Early life and family ==
Mackall was born May 17, 1920, in Negley, Ohio and grew up on a farm in Wellsville, Ohio. He was the eldest son of Roy Floyd Mackall and Alda May Toland Newton Mackall.

He played on the East Palestine High School football team and quit school after the tenth grade.

From age 16 to 21, he worked in the pottery trade at the Sterling China Company, and was a member of Local Union Number 42.

== World War II ==
Mackall was drafted into military service in Lacarne, Ohio on January 7, 1942, and received his basic training at Camp Wolters, Texas. He volunteered for parachute training at Fort Benning. After his training, he deployed for overseas duty with the first unit of the airborne command. He served in Company E, 2nd Battalion, 509th Parachute Infantry Regiment, nickname "Geronimos" under the command of Lieutenant Colonel Edson Raff.

It was reported that Mackall volunteered to fight as a paratrooper because it offered "the best opportunity to fight Hitler."

Mackall loved to read and write, and would stay up late at night writing short stories. In his letters back home, Mackall wrote that he had penned a book on his experiences and had interested a publisher in England. The only manuscript was lost after his death.

"You know me, I sweat a lot of things out, but nothing serious ever happens. If it should though, I want you to please turn my defense bonds over to Shirley so she can go to college. Now, don't worry about me. When you hear the song 'We'll Meet Again,' just imagine I'm singing it to you because that's the way I feel. I have no doubt but what I'll return."

— John Thomas Mackall, Last letter to his mother, published in the Times Herald

== Death ==
In Operation Torch, the Allied invasion of North Africa, during an airborne mission, he was mortally wounded in an attack by French Vichy aircraft as he landed near Oran, Algeria. Seven paratroopers died at the scene and several were wounded, including Mackall. He was evacuated by air to a British hospital at Gibraltar, where he died on November 12, 1942. He had been wounded on November 8, the day that construction began at the Hoffman Air Borne Camp.

After his death, the Army learned that Mackall had a hand deformity which he managed to keep as a secret to allow for him to be enlisted and pass the Army physical.

Originally buried in Gibraltar, he was re-interred with full military honors at Glenview Cemetery in East Palestine, Ohio in 1944.

== Awards and honors ==
Mackall was a recipient of a Purple Heart, and cited posthumously by President Franklin D. Roosevelt.

He is an honoree on the World War II Memorial registry. Mackall is the namesake of "Pvt. Tommy Mackall VFW Post 5647" in Wellsville, Ohio.

=== Camp Mackall ===
On February 8, 1943, Hoffman Air Borne Camp was renamed "Camp Mackall" by the United States Department of War in Mackall's honor in General Order Number 6.

A ceremony was held honoring him in May 1943, which was attended by his mother, stepfather, and siblings, and Major General Elbridge Chapman, commanding general of the Airborne Command. The ceremony included a mass chute descent by over 200 paratroopers, glider demonstration, and parade.

A bronze plaque was unveiled honoring Mackall, and later replaced with a granite monument at the Camp's entrance. A highway historical marker bears his name.

== In popular culture ==
Private Mackall was included in a question in the Pittsburg Press How's Your I.Q.? quiz series. A tribute Calvalcade of America radio program about Mackall and his service was aired on NBC Radio in April 1943.

Mackall's story is included in Gregory Hall's 2006 novel, Not Forgotten, and Tony Peluso's 2013 novel, Waggoners Gap.
