= Leslie Run (Bull Creek tributary) =

Stream in Ohio, USA

Leslie Run Tributary to Bull Creek
- Location of Leslie Run mouth Leslie Run (Bull Creek tributary) (the United States)

Location
- Country: United States
- State: Ohio
- County: Columbiana
- City: East Palestine; Negley

Physical characteristics
- Source: Yellow Creek divide
  - location: about 1.5 miles northeast of New Waterford, Ohio
  - coordinates: 40°51′38.00″N 080°35′59.99″W
  - elevation: 1,240 ft (380 m)
- Mouth: Bull Creek
  - location: Negley, Ohio
  - coordinates: 40°47′17.22″N 080°32′57.25″W
  - elevation: 830 ft (250 m)
- Length: 7.54 mi (12.13 km)
- Basin size: 14.58 square miles (37.8 km^{2})
- Discharge
  - location: Bull Creek
  - average: 16.26 cu ft/s (0.460 m^{3}/s) at mouth with Bull Creek

Basin features
- Progression: Bull Creek → North Fork Little Beaver Creek → Little Beaver Creek → Ohio River → Mississippi River → Gulf of Mexico
- River system: Ohio River
- Tributaries
  - left: Sulphur Run
  - right: unnamed tributaries
- Bridges: Hisey Road, Waterford Road, Hamilton Road, Morris Drive, Spaite Drive (x2), Kemple Drive, Brookdale Avenue, Bacon Avenue, Park Drive, Carbon Hill Road, Bye Road, OH 154

Leslie Run is a 7.54 mi (12.13 km) long third-order tributary to Bull Creek in Columbiana County, Ohio.

== Variant names ==
According to the Geographic Names Information System, it has also been known historically as:

- Leslets Run
- Lesleys Run
- Leslies Run
- Lesslies Run

== Course ==
Leslie Run rises on the Yellow Creek divide about 1.5 miles northeast of New Waterford, Ohio, and then flows southeast and south to join Bull Creek at Negley, Ohio.

== Watershed ==
Leslie Run drains 14.58 square miles (37.8 km^{2}) of area, receives about 36.94 in/year of precipitation, and is about 47.86% forested.

== See also ==
- List of rivers of Ohio
