= Eastern Palestine =

Eastern Palestine may refer to:

- A historic term for Transjordan (region), the part of the geographic Palestine region east of the Jordan river
- The West Bank, a landlocked geographical area, located in Western Asia

== See also ==
- East Palestine, Ohio
