= Sulphur Run (Leslie Run tributary) =

Stream in Ohio, USA

Sulphur Run Tributary to Leslie Run
- Location of Sulphur Run mouth Sulphur Run (Leslie Run tributary) (the United States)

Location
- Country: United States
- State: Ohio
- County: Columbiana
- City: East Palestine

Physical characteristics
- Source: Gould Pond
  - location: about 0.5 miles north of East Palestine, Ohio
  - coordinates: 40°51′9.00″N 080°32′13.00″W
  - elevation: 1,110 ft (340 m)
- Mouth: Leslie Run
  - location: East Palestine, Ohio
  - coordinates: 40°49′55.22″N 080°32′40.25″W
  - elevation: 971 ft (296 m)
- Length: 2.17 mi (3.49 km)
- Basin size: 3.12 square miles (8.1 km^{2})
- Discharge
  - location: Leslie Run
  - average: 3.87 cu ft/s (0.110 m^{3}/s) at mouth with Leslie Run

Basin features
- Progression: Leslie Run → Bull Creek → North Fork Little Beaver Creek → Little Beaver Creek → Ohio River → Mississippi River → Gulf of Mexico
- River system: Ohio River
- Tributaries
  - left: unnamed tributaries
  - right: unnamed tributaries
- Bridges: Concord Drive, E Martin Street, E Taggart Street, N James Street, N Liberty Street, N Sumner Street, N Market Street, N Walnut Street, West Street, W Main Street

Sulphur Run is a 2.17 mi (3.49 km) long second-order tributary to Leslie Run in Columbiana County, Ohio.

== Course ==
Sulphur Run rises in Gould Pond about 0.5 miles north of East Palestine, Ohio, and then flows south and southwest to join Leslie Run at East Palestine.

== Watershed ==
Sulphur Run drains 3.12 square miles (8.1 km^{2}) of area, receives about 38.65 in/year of precipitation, and is about 39.63% forested.

== See also ==
- List of rivers of Ohio
