= Camp Mackall =

U.S. Army facility

Mackall Army Airfield
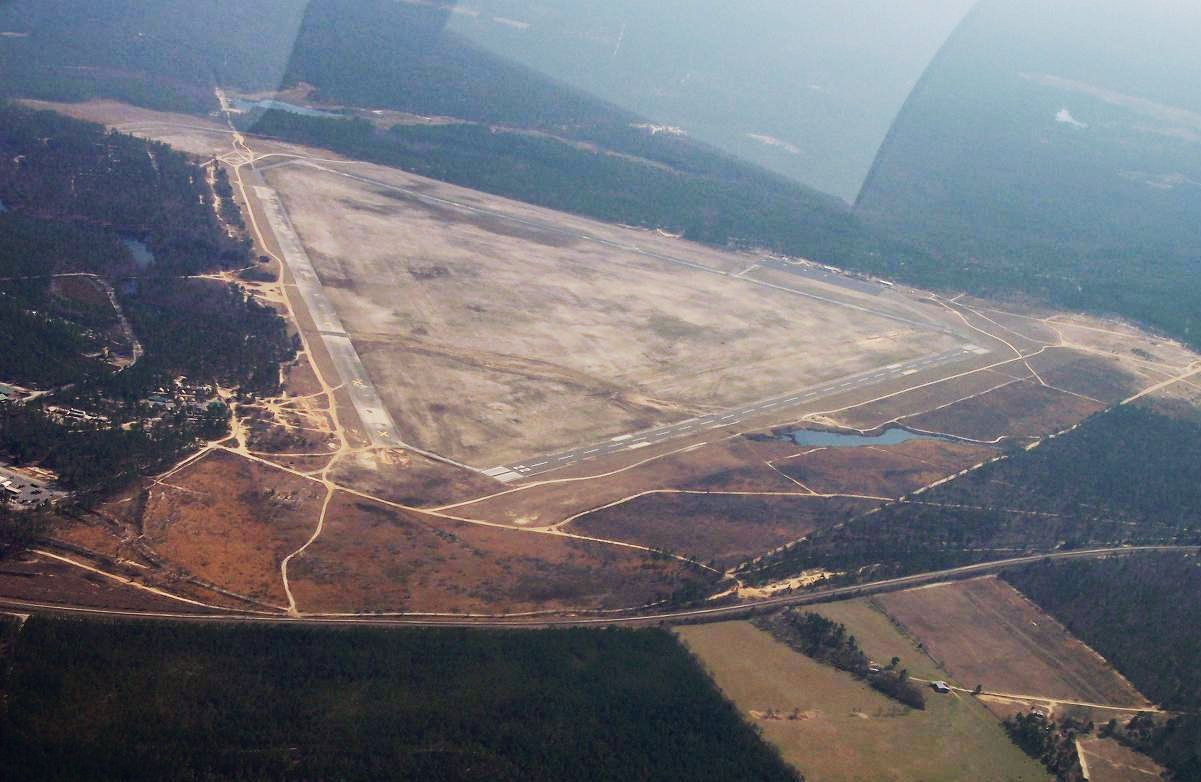
- IATA: HFF; ICAO: KHFF; FAA LID: HFF

Summary
- Airport type: Military
- Owner: U.S. Army ATCA-ASO
- Location: Richmond, Scotland counties, North Carolina
- Elevation AMSL: 376 ft (115 m)
- Coordinates: 35°02′11″N 079°29′51″W
- Interactive map of Mackall Army Airfield

Runways
Direction	Length		Surface
Direction	ft	m	Surface
4/22	5,001	1,524	Asphalt
12/30	4,740	1,445	Concrete
16/34	5,529	1,676	Concrete
- Source: Federal Aviation Administration

Camp Mackall is an active U.S. Army training facility located in eastern Richmond County and northern Scotland County, North Carolina, south of the town of Southern Pines. The facility is in close proximity to and is a subinstallation of Fort Bragg (home to the XVIII Airborne Corps, the 82nd Airborne Division, and the U.S. Army Special Operations Command headquarters). Camp Mackall is the setting of primary training to become a member of U.S. Army Special Forces.

== History ==
Originally named Camp Hoffman, on February 8, 1943, General Order Number 6 renamed the facility Camp Mackall in honor of Private John Thomas "Tommy" Mackall.

Historian Stephen E. Ambrose described the camp as a "marvel of wartime construction", having been converted from 62,000 acres of wilderness to a camp "with 65 miles of paved roads, a 1,200-bed hospital, five movie theaters, six huge beer gardens, a complete all-weather airfield with three 5,000-foot runways, and 1,750 buildings" in just four months.

== Facilities ==
The Mackall Army Airfield has three runways: 4/22 is 5,001 by 150 feet (1,524 x 46 m) with an asphalt surface and 12/30 (originally designated 11/29) is 4,740 by 150 feet (1,445 x 46 m) with a concrete surface. A new runway 16/34 was constructed in 2016, and is restricted to use by unmanned aerial vehicles. It is 5500 by 150 feet (1676 x 46 m) and has a concrete surface.

The Colonel James "Nick" Rowe Training Compound hosts SERE, SFAS (the Q Course), and other training courses. It is named for Col. James N. Rowe. The obstacle course at the camp, arguably the hardest obstacle course in the U.S. Army, is named the "Nasty Nick" in honor of Rowe.

== See also ==
- North Carolina World War II Army Airfields
