= W. S. George Pottery Company =

Former American ceramics manufacturer

- Company type: Private
- Industry: Ceramics
- Founded: 1904; 122 years ago
- Defunct: 1960; 66 years ago
- Headquarters: East Palestine, Ohio, U.S.
- Area served: Worldwide

The W. S. George Pottery Company was a ceramics manufacturer headquartered in East Palestine, Ohio, United States. It was established in 1904 and operated additional facilities in Canonsburg, Pennsylvania, and Kittanning, Pennsylvania. It was absorbed by the Royal China Company in the 1950s.

== History ==
William Shaw George purchased the controlling interest in the former East Palestine Pottery Company from the Sebring brothers in 1904, renaming it to the W. S. George Pottery Company. In 1910, the company opened a manufacturing facility in Canonsburg, Pennsylvania (Plant #2), and in 1914 another facility was opened in Kittanning, Pennsylvania ("Plant #3"). A 1912 fire destroyed most of the original East Palestine facility (Plant #1), which employed 750 East Palestine residents at the time accounting for nearly one third of the city's population. The facility was rebuilt in 1924 as Plant #4. The company went bankrupt in 1955, and the East Palestine facility was reorganized and came under the control and administration of the Royal China Company. W. S. George Pottery liquidated its holdings between 1959 and 1960, and formally went defunct in 1960.

== Products ==
The W. S. George Pottery Company produced semi-porcelain dinnerware, hotel ware, and toilet wares. At its peak, the company was able to produce over 800,000 dozen-piece sets of dinnerware.

Category	Typecoffee cup	Line
Hotel Wares	Soap Dish	-
Toilet Wares	Shaving Mug	Queen Line, Vashti Line
Toilet Wares	Wash Basin	Queen Line, Vashti Line
Toilet Wares	Pitcher	Vashti Line
Dinnerware	Plates	Derwood Shape
Dinnerware	Plates	Radisson Shape
Dinnerware	Plates	Lido Shape
Dinnerware	Plates	Bolero Shape
