= Joint Personnel Recovery Agency =

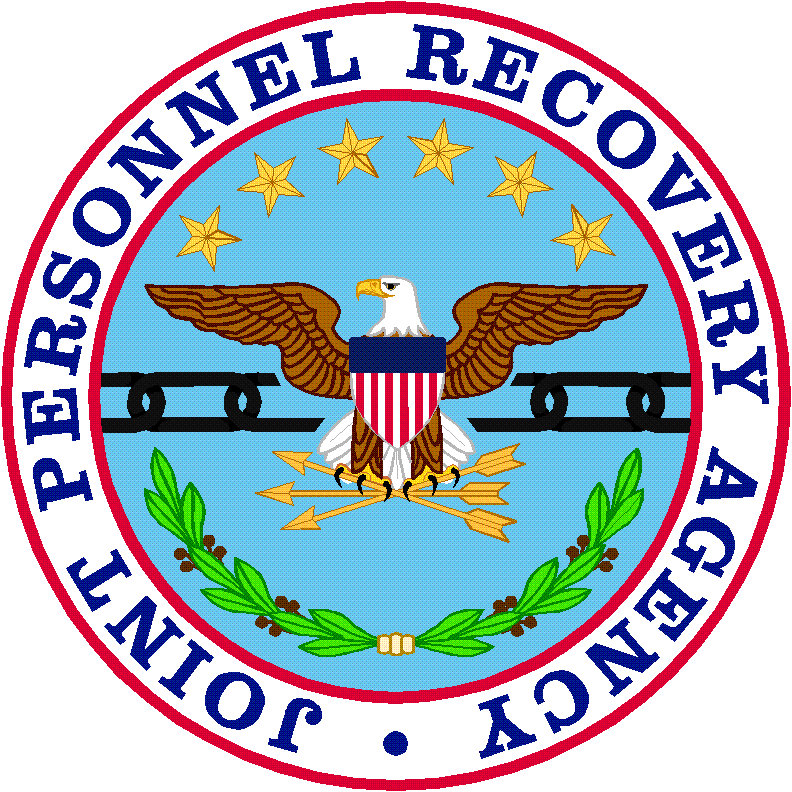
- Official Seal of JPRA
- Active: October 1, 1999; 27 years ago
- Country: United States
- Type: Chairman's Controlled Activity
- Role: Personnel recovery
- Headquarters: Fort Belvoir, Virginia
- Motto: "These things we do that others may live... to return with honor."
- Website: www.jpra.mil

Insignia
- Abbreviation: JPRA

The Joint Personnel Recovery Agency (JPRA) is a Chairman's Controlled Activity and is designated as the United States Department of Defense's (DoD) office of primary responsibility for DoD-wide personnel recovery (PR) matters, less policy. JPRA is headquartered in Fort Belvoir, Virginia, with schools located in Fredericksburg, Virginia, and Spokane, Washington. JPRA currently provides for commanders, forces, and individuals on joint PR activities through development and conduct of education and training courses, and specialized individual training. The agency assesses, advises, and evaluates PR curriculum and establishes Joint PR standards in collaboration with the DoD Components for formal Joint PR training, including Code of Conduct and SERE. JPRA also provides DoD Components with analytical support, technology research and integration, maintenance of databases and archives, and development of lessons learned. JPRA encourages partnerships by assisting with non-DoD agencies, multinational partners, and others, with PR-related education and training programs.

The goals of the Joint Personnel Recovery Agency include: returning isolated US personnel to friendly control, denying enemies of the US a potential source of intelligence, preventing the exploitation of captured US personnel in propaganda programs, and maintaining the morale of US fighting forces and the "national will." According to the DoD, the agency's "core" capabilities consist of providing personnel recovery guidance, developing, conducting, and supporting personnel recovery education and training, providing support to operations, exercises, and deploying forces, and ensuring that personnel recovery remains viable through the adaptation of lessons learned, research and development, and other validated inputs.

== Agency Seal ==
The blue background, symbolizing sky and space, represents the limitlessness of DoD recovery operations worldwide.

The red, white and blue border represents the physical and mental anguish of past warfighters in their loss of freedom or life; and valor of each service in pursuit of its personnel recovery mission.

The stars represent the six articles of the Code of Conduct to help U.S. warriors survive, evade, resist and escape (SERE) toward ultimate recovery.

The eagle and wreath are adapted from the Seal of the Department of Defense and symbolize the commitment of Department forces to protect isolated personnel and the swiftness of response.

The laurel (left side of the wreath) represents honors received in combat and the olive branch (right side of the wreath) represents the defense of peace.

The broken chain represents mental and physical oppressions that the Code of Conduct, personnel recovery training and DOD Recovery Forces serve to defeat.

== History ==
The JPRA has its roots in World War II and the Korean War. In 1942, a military intelligence service was formed to help US forces evade and escape from the enemy. In 1952, the United States Department of Defense (DoD) designated the United States Air Force (USAF) as executive agent (EA) for Escape and Evasion (E & E) activities. Training was mostly for pilots and aircrew as they were considered the most likely to be isolated. After the Korean War, DoD implemented a Code of Conduct for all of the services; it was revised after the Vietnam War.

In the early 1990s, DoD began to focus more on the importance of personnel recovery (PR) and in 1991 the Joint Services Survival, Evasion, Resistance, and Escape (SERE) agency (JSSA) was designated the DoD EA for DoD Prisoner of War / Missing in Action (POW / MIA) matters. In 1994, the Joint Staff appointed the JSSA as the focal point for PR. The Department of Defense appointed the US Air Force as the Executive Agent for Joint Combat Search and Rescue (JCSAR). In 1999, JPRA was created as an agency under the commander-in-chief, US Joint Forces Command (USJFCOM) and was named the Office of Primary Responsibility (OPR) for DoD-wide PR matters. After the disestablishment of USJFCOM, JPRA was designated a Chairman’s Controlled Activity in August 2011.

== See also ==
- European Personnel Recovery Centre
