= Fred Hoaglin =

American football player and coach (1944–2026)

No. 54, 53
- Position: Center

Personal information
- Born: January 28, 1944; Alliance, Ohio, U.S.
- Died: August 1, 2026 (aged 82); Hilton Head Island, South Carolina, U.S.
- Listed height: 6 ft 4 in (1.93 m)
- Listed weight: 250 lb (113 kg)

Career information
- High school: East Palestine (East Palestine, Ohio)
- College: Pittsburgh (1962–1965)
- NFL draft: 1966: 6th round, 93rd overall pick

Career history

Playing
- Cleveland Browns (1966–1972); Baltimore Colts (1973); Houston Oilers (1974–1975); Seattle Seahawks (1976)

Coaching
- Detroit Lions (1978–1984) Offensive line coach; New York Giants (1985–1992) Offensive line coach; New England Patriots (1993–1996) Offensive line coach; Jacksonville Jaguars (1997–2001) Tight ends coach

Awards and highlights
- As a player: Pro Bowl (1969); As a coach: 2× Super Bowl champion (XXI, XXV)

Career NFL statistics
- Games played: 142
- Games started: 89
- Fumble recoveries: 2
- Stats at Pro Football Reference

George Frederick Hoaglin (January 28, 1944 – August 1, 2026) was an American professional football player who was a center in the National Football League (NFL) from 1966 to 1976. He played college football for the Pittsburgh Panthers.

== Playing career ==
Hoaglin graduated from East Palestine High School in East Palestine, Ohio, in 1962. At East Palestine, he played under coach Rey Dempsey. He then attended the University of Pittsburgh, from where he was eventually drafted 93rd overall by the Cleveland Browns in the sixth round of the 1966 NFL draft as a center. Hoaglin graduated from the university in 1968 with a degree in industrial engineering.

In the 1966 Cleveland Browns season, Hoaglin was promoted from the taxi squad to the active roster after an injury to John Morrow. Hoaglin was a starting player on the Browns through 1972, starting all 14 games in four consecutive seasons and helping the team win multiple division titles while blocking for Pro Bowl and future Hall of Fame running back Leroy Kelly. He earned a Pro Bowl selection in 1969, and during his tenure the Browns reached the NFL championship in 1968 and 1969. After playing through a calf injury in 1971, he contributed to another division-winning season in 1972.

He was traded to the Baltimore Colts in 1973 and then the Houston Oilers in 1974, where he played 28 games over two seasons. He was taken by the Seattle Seahawks from the Oilers in the 1976 NFL expansion draft. He played 13 games with the Seahawks before retiring as a player at the end of the season.

== Coaching career ==
After he retired as a player, Hoaglin served as an assistant coach for the Detroit Lions (1978–1984), New York Giants (1985–1992), New England Patriots (1993–1996), and Jacksonville Jaguars (1997–2000), serving under the Bill Parcells coaching tree during his stints at the last three franchises.

Hoaglin was an assistant coach for the Giants during their Super Bowl XXI and Super Bowl XXV championship seasons under Parcells, then won an AFC Championship at New England under Parcells in 1996 before the Patriots fell 35–21 to the Green Bay Packers in Super Bowl XXXI.

Parcells resigned from the Patriots to take the head coaching job with the New York Jets after that loss, but Hoaglin joined fellow Parcells coaching tree disciple Tom Coughlin with the Jacksonville Jaguars as the tight ends coach. During his time there, the Jaguars won two AFC Central Division titles, reached the playoffs in three consecutive seasons, and played in the 1999 AFC Championship Game.

== Personal life and death ==
Hoaglin retired in 2001 and died on August 1, 2026, at the age of 82.
