= Negley, Ohio =

- Census-designated place
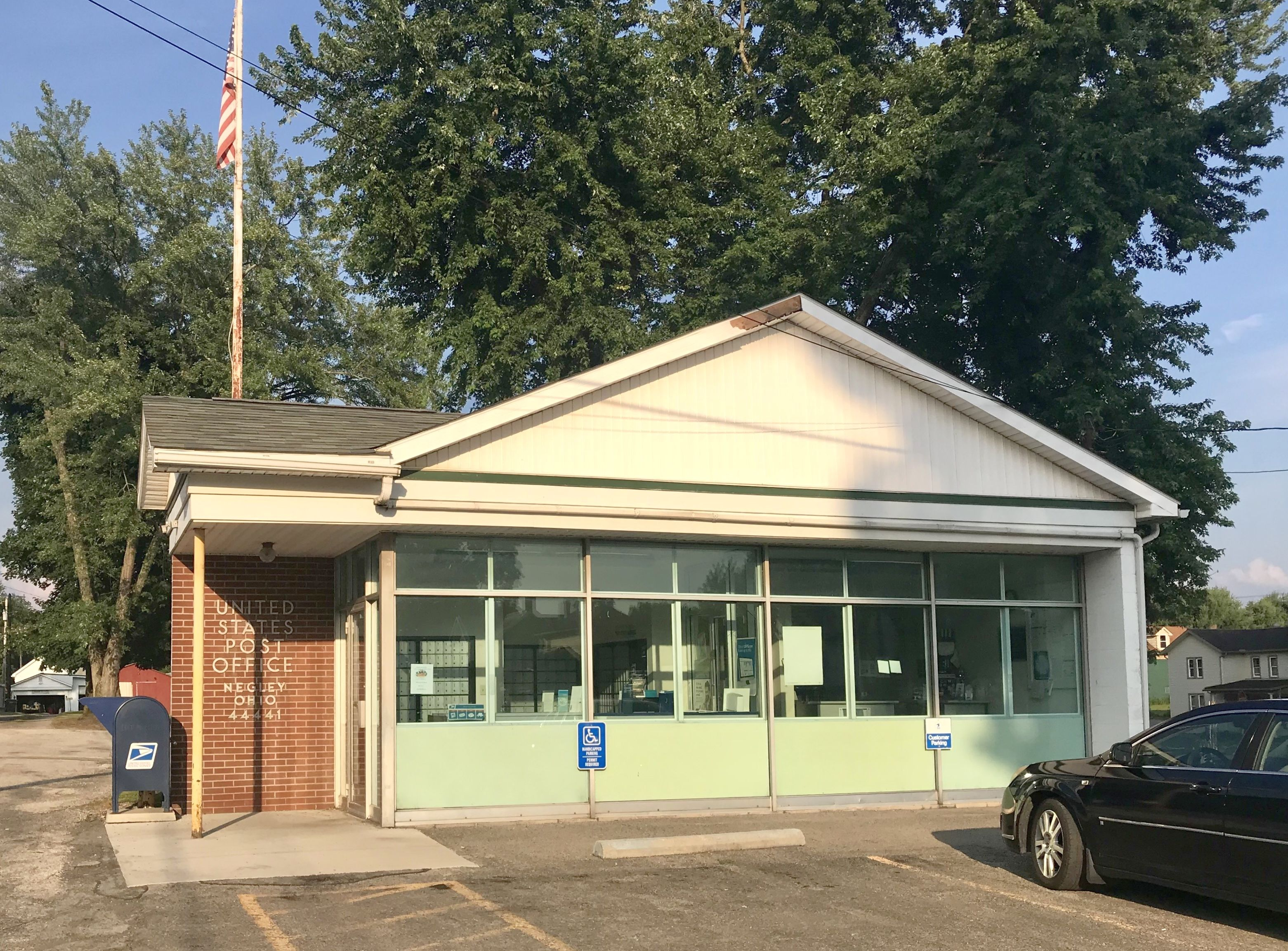
- Negley post office

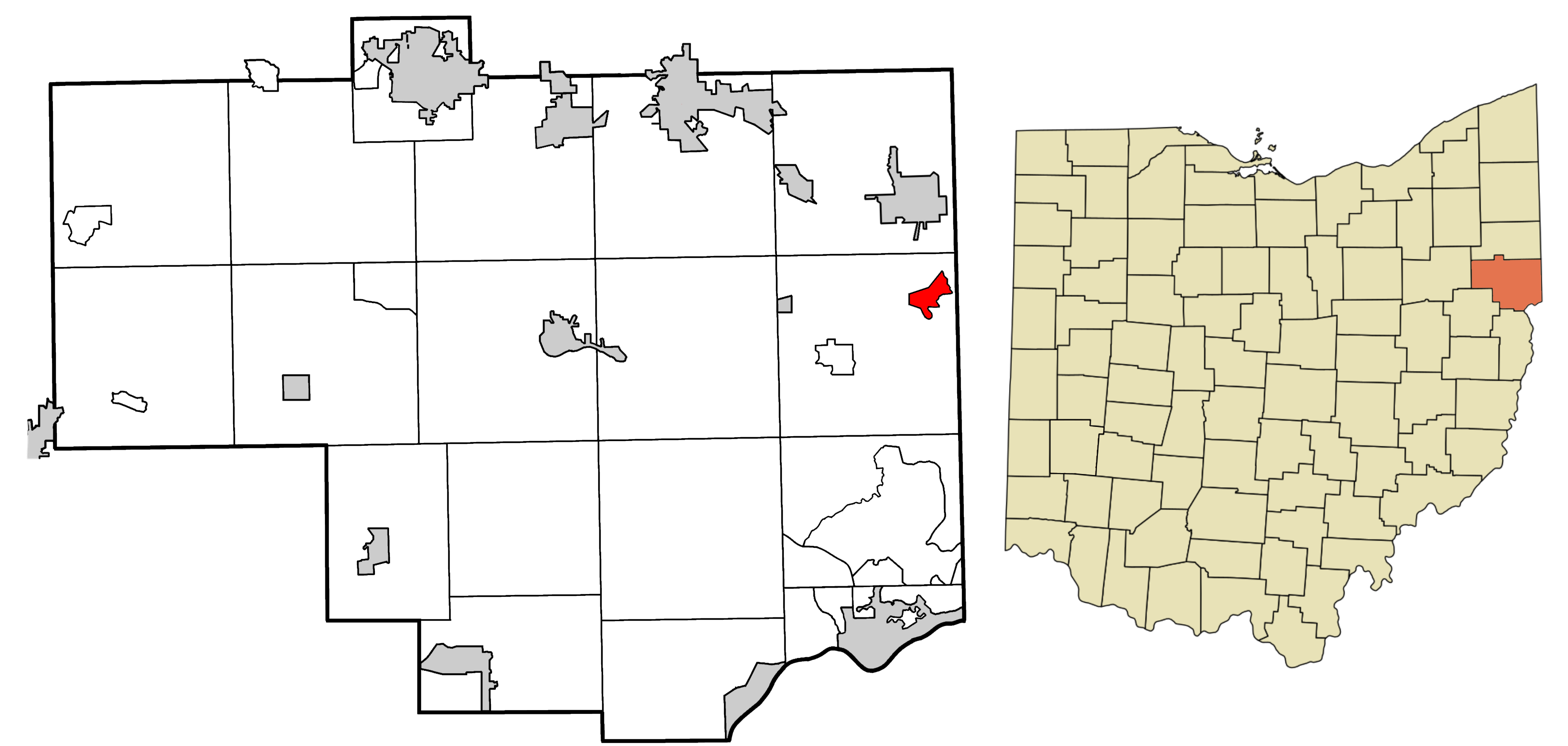
- Location of Negley in Columbiana County, Ohio.

- Location within Ohio Location within the United States
- Coordinates: 40°47′34″N 80°32′09″W
- Country: United States
- State: Ohio
- County: Columbiana
- Township: Middleton

Area
  - Total: 0.90 sq mi (2.32 km^{2})
  - Land: 0.90 sq mi (2.32 km^{2})
  - Water: 0 sq mi (0.00 km^{2})
- Elevation: 856 ft (261 m)

Population (2020)
  - Total: 274
  - Density: 305.6/sq mi (118.01/km^{2})
- Time zone: UTC-5 (Eastern (EST))
  - Summer (DST): UTC-4 (EDT)
- ZIP code: 44441
- Area codes: 330, 234
- FIPS code: 39-53802
- GNIS feature ID: 2628937
- School District: East Palestine City School District

Negley is an unincorporated community and census-designated place in Middleton Township, Columbiana County, Ohio, United States. The population was 274 at the 2020 census.

== History ==
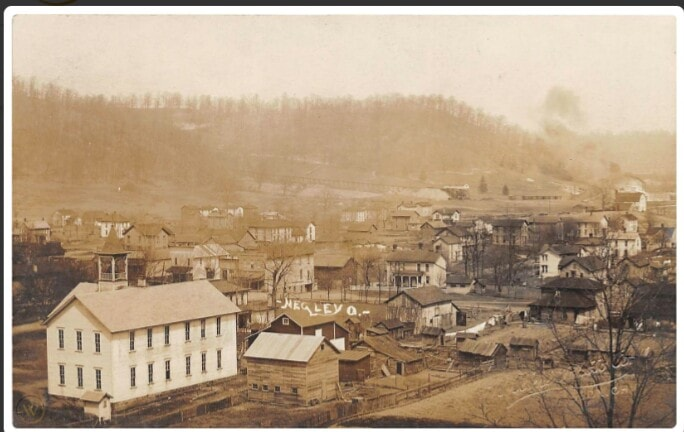
View of Negley c. 1910

Historical population
Census	Pop.	Note	%±
2010	281		—
2020	274		−2.5%
U.S. Decennial Census

The community is named for James S. Negley, a Union Army major general. After the Civil War, he served in the U.S. House of Representatives before entering the railroad industry as president of the New York, Pittsburgh & Chicago Railway. It platted Negley in 1883 as the first new town along the line, naming it in his honor. The Negley post office was established that year, and the town grew into a small mining community based on a nearby coal mine operated by the Powers Mining Company.

== Geography ==
Negley is located in eastern Middleton Township, near the Ohio state border with Pennsylvania. It is located on both the North Fork of the Little Beaver Creek and Bull Creek at the foothills of the Appalachian Mountains. According to the United States Census Bureau, the Negley CDP has a total area of 0.89 square miles (2.31 km^{2}), all land.

== Economy ==
PennOhio Waste operates a construction and demolition debris landfill in Negley.

== Education ==
Children in Negley are served by the East Palestine City School District, which includes one elementary school, one middle school, and East Palestine High School. Negley once had a traditional schoolhouse of its own, and later an elementary school.

== Transportation ==
State Route 170 runs north–south through Negley, and State Route 154 runs east–west through the community as Richardson Avenue. The short-line Youngstown and Southeastern Railroad passes through the community. Negley was formerly home to the only Youngstown and Southern Railway shop.

== Notable people ==
- Ammon Hennacy, Christian anarchist
- John Thomas MacKall, U.S. Army paratrooper during World War II
- Kyle Maite, rhythm and lead guitarist for Hit the Lights
- Derek Wolfe, former NFL defensive end for the Denver Broncos and Baltimore Ravens
