= George Morris (halfback) =

American football player (1919–1999)

- Morris with Baldwin Wallace, 1939

No. 4, 49
- Position: Halfback

Personal information
- Born: February 24, 1919; East Palestine, Ohio, U.S.
- Died: September 13, 1999 (aged 80); Palm Beach Gardens, Florida, U.S.
- Listed height: 5 ft 11 in (1.80 m)
- Listed weight: 189 lb (86 kg)

Career information
- High school: East Palestine (OH)
- College: Baldwin Wallace (1937–1940)
- NFL draft: 1941: undrafted

Career history
- Cleveland Rams (1941–1942)

Career NFL statistics
- Games: 19
- Games started: 4
- Rushing yards: 134
- Stats at Pro Football Reference

George William Morris Sr. (February 24, 1919 – September 13, 1999) was an American football player. He played college football as a halfback for Baldwin Wallace from 1937 to 1940, leading all Ohio players with 100 points in 1939. He played professional football in the National Football League (NFL) in 1941 and 1942 before leaving football to serve in the United States Marine Corps during World War II.

== Early life ==
Morris was born in 1919 at East Palestine, Ohio, and attended East Palestine High School.

== Baldwin-Wallace ==
Morris played college football at the halfback position for Baldwin Wallace University from 1937 to 1940. As a junior, he was the highest scorer in Ohio with 100 points, led the 1939 Baldwin–Wallace Yellow Jackets football team to a 6–2 record, and won a spot on the 1939 All-Ohio Conference football team. He also set two school records with five touchdowns and 33 points in a 1939 game against Grand Rapids. After the season, he was interviewed by sports writer Bud Collins, asked how he'd scored so many points, and replied, "Kid, it was easy. I just greased my ass and slid on through."

== Professional football and military service ==
Morris then played professional football in the National Football League (NFL) as a halfback for the Cleveland Rams. As a rookie in 1941, he appeared in 10 games, three as a starter, tallying 69 rushing yards on 24 carries, 17 receiving yards on nine pass receptions, 33 yards on five punt returns, and 118 yards on eight kickoff returns.

In 1942, following the attack on Pearl Harbor, Morris enlisted in the United States Marine Corps, but was not called to active duty until the end of the year. During the 1942 season, he appeared in nine games for the Rams, tallying 65 rushing yards on 22 carries and intercepting two passes on defense.

Morris entered active duy in 1943 as a lieutenant and saw action in the South Pacific.

== Later life ==
After the war, the Browns offered Morris a contract, but "after years of combat in the Pacific with the Marines, he'd had enough of putting his bottom on the line." Morris instead returned to East Palestine, Ohio, where he worked as a butcher. He operated his father's business Morris Golden Dawn Foods in East Palestine.

Morris and his wife of 58 years, Esther J. Wilhelm Morris, had three children: George W. Morris Jr., Bonnie Baird, and Thomas Morris. Their son George Jr. played football for Baldwin-Wallace in the early 1960s.

Morris lived in southern Florida for the last 26 years of his life. He died in 1999 at Palm Beach Gardens, Florida.
