= East Palestine City School District =

School district in Ohio

Address
- 200 West North Avenue East Palestine, Columbiana, Ohio, 44413-1779; United States
- Coordinates: 40°50′18″N 80°32′36″W

District information
- Type: Public school district
- Grades: PK-12
- Established: March 1875; 150 years ago
- Superintendent: Dr. James Rook
- School board: 5
- Chair of the board: Erika Kinkead
- Governing agency: Ohio Department of Education
- Schools: 3
- Budget: $13,735,000
- NCES District ID: 3904392
- District ID: OH-043927

Students and staff
- Students: 985
- Teachers: 72.94 (on an FTE basis)
- Staff: 62.20 (on an FTE basis)
- Student–teacher ratio: 13.50:1
- District mascot: Bulldog
- Colors: Brown, orange, and white

Other information
- Website: myepschools.org

The East Palestine City School District is a public school district serving East Palestine and parts of surrounding Middleton and Unity townships in northeastern Columbiana County in Ohio, in the United States. It also includes Negley and a small portion of Columbiana.

== Schools ==
- East Palestine High School
- East Palestine Middle School
- East Palestine Elementary School

Former schools

- Captain Taggart School - Closed in 1997, currently a nursing home
- Negley School - currently Schoolhouse Square Community Center
- Unity School - currently Maxwell China, Inc.
- East North Avenue School - Closed in 1997, currently a private residence
