= Personnel recovery =

Recovering military personnel

Honduran military medics bandage U.S. Army Staff Sgt. David Simpson, a simulated casualty, for evacuation during an Isolated Personal Recovery Exercise near Soto Cano Air Base, Honduras, April 25, 2013.

The United States Armed Forces, in Joint Publication 3-50 Personnel Recovery, defines personnel recovery as "the sum of military, diplomatic, and civil efforts to prepare for and execute the recovery and reintegration of isolated personnel."

The Joint Personnel Recovery Agency is the Chairman's Controlled Activity and is designated as DoD's office of primary responsibility for DoD-wide personnel recovery (PR) matters, less policy.

The European Personnel Recovery Centre facilitates the harmonisation of personnel recovery policy, doctrine and standards through clear lines of communications with partners stakeholders (nations and international organizations).

== The five PR execution tasks ==
1. Report: Begins with the recognition of an isolating event. It must be both timely and accurate.
2. Locate: Involves the effort to find and authenticate isolated personnel. Accurate position and positive ID are generally required prior to committing forces.
3. Support: Involves support for isolated personnel and their families. It can include establishing two-way communications, dropping supplies, or suppressing enemy threats.
4. Recover: Involves coordinated actions of commanders and staffs, recovery forces and the isolated individual.
5. Reintegrate: The primary consideration is the physical and mental health of the recovered personnel.

== See also ==
- Joint Personnel Recovery Agency
- Manhunt (military)
