= East Palestine, Ohio =

- Village
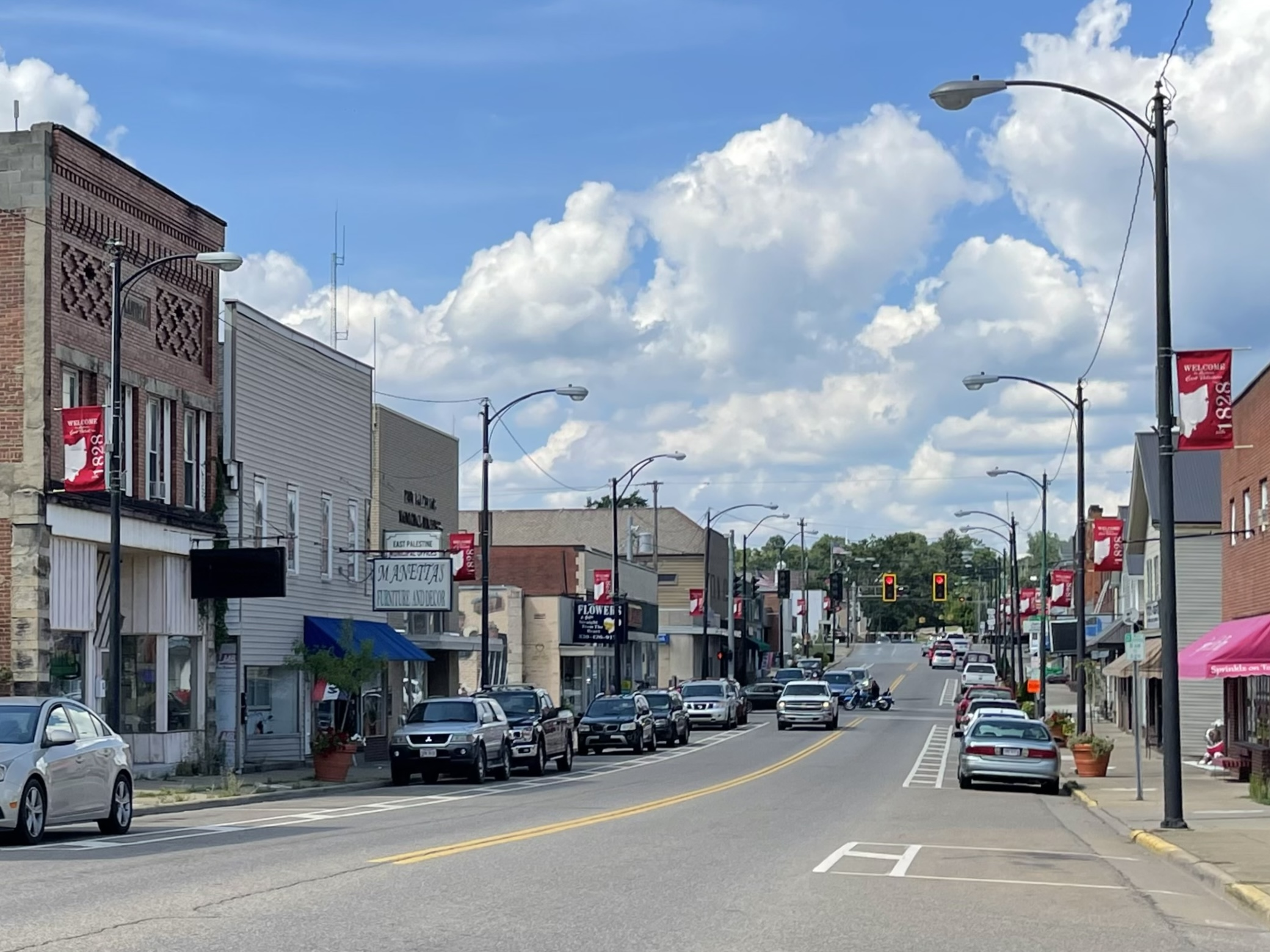
- Market Street (State Route 170)

- Flag Seal Logo
- Motto: "Where you want to be!"
- Interactive map of East Palestine, Ohio
- Location within Ohio Location within the United States
- Coordinates: 40°50′21″N 80°32′48″W
- Country: United States
- State: Ohio
- County: Columbiana
- Founded: 1828 (as Mechanicsburg)
- Incorporated: 1875
- Named for: Palestine (region)

Government
  - Type: Council-Manager
  - Mayor: Trent R. Conaway (I)
  - Village Manager: Antonio Diaz-Guy

Area
  - Total: 3.15 sq mi (8.16 km^{2})
  - Land: 3.15 sq mi (8.16 km^{2})
  - Water: 0 sq mi (0.00 km^{2})
- Elevation: 1,040 ft (320 m)

Population (2020)
  - Total: 4,761
  - Estimate (2023): 4,658
  - Density: 1,510.6/sq mi (583.25/km^{2})
- Time zone: UTC−5 (EST)
  - Summer (DST): UTC−4 (EDT)
- ZIP Code: 44413
- Area code: 330, 234
- FIPS code: 39-23940
- GNIS ID: 2394603
- Website: eastpalestine-oh.gov

East Palestine (/ˌpæləˈstaɪn/ PAL-ə-STEEN) is a village in Columbiana County, Ohio, United States. The population was 4,761 at the 2020 census. It is located on the Ohio–Pennsylvania border, about 20 miles (32 km) south of Youngstown and 40 miles (64 km) northwest of Pittsburgh.

The village was home to industries in ceramics and tire manufacturing from the 1870s until the mid-1960s. East Palestine is located along the Norfolk Southern Railway and has a freight train station. In 2023, the village was the site of a major train derailment that spilled vinyl chloride and triggered significant evacuations in the jurisdiction.

== History ==
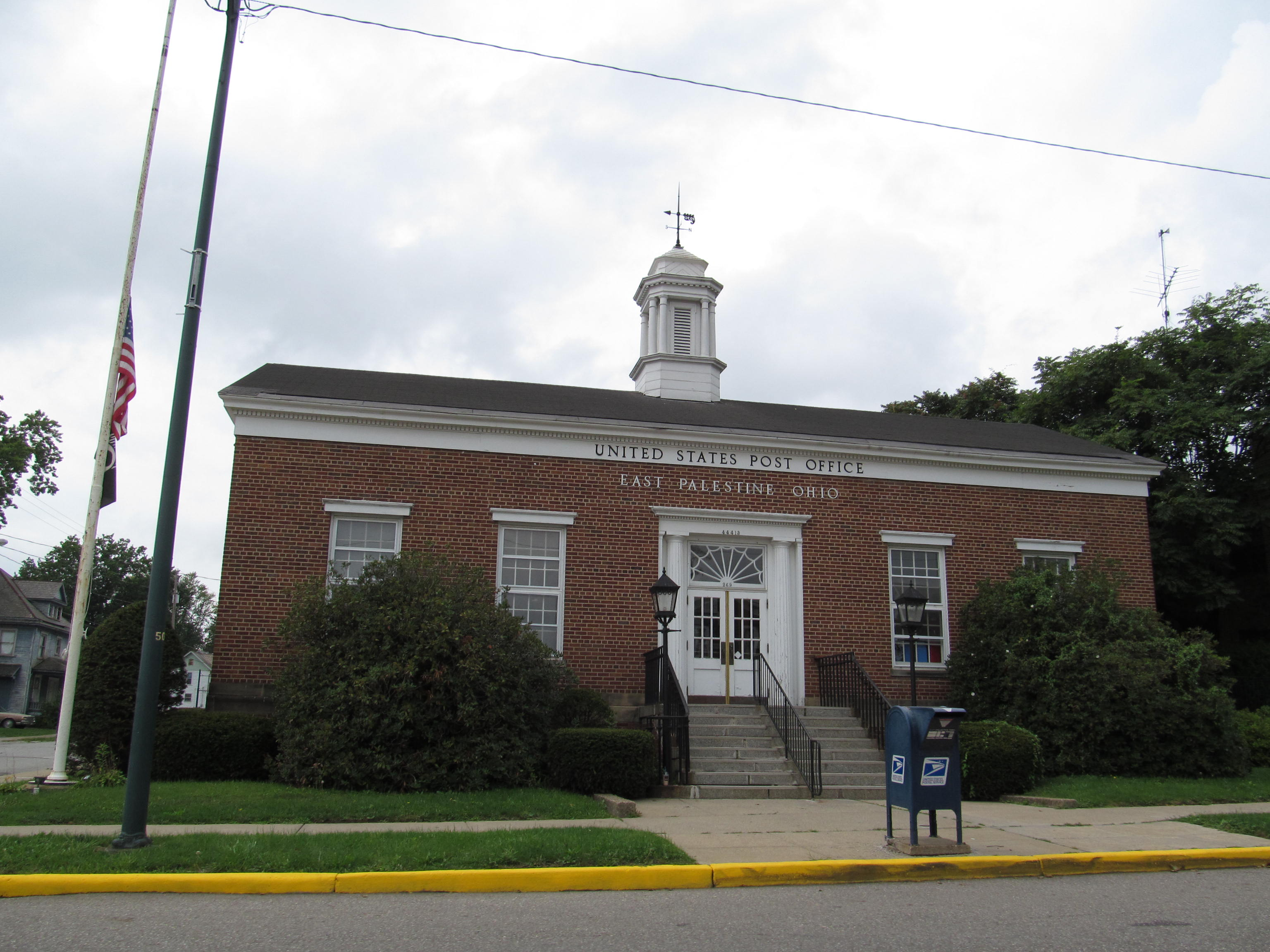
The East Palestine Post Office was built in 1937 as part of the New Deal.

East Palestine was platted in 1828 by Thomas McCalla and William Grate, initially known as Mechanicsburg. In 1833, it was renamed after the region of Palestine in West Asia. The name was changed as part of a religious nomenclature in the area, including communities such as Enon Valley, Medina, New Galilee and Salem. However, Palestine, Ohio, was already an incorporated community in the western part of the state, so the town was incorporated as East Palestine in 1875.

Its incorporation was reclassified as a city in 1920. By that time, railroad facilities of the city consisted of the four-track Pennsylvania Railroad system. Switches from the Pittsburgh, Lisbon, and Western Railroad within one mile of the corporation limits connected with the Pittsburgh and Lake Erie Railroad and New York Central Railroad.

The city's economy was led by industries in ceramics and tire manufacturing in the 20th century. A pottery was started in 1880 and would become the W. S. George Pottery Company in 1904; the plant operated into the 1980s as part of Royal China Company. Automobile tires were made by the McGraw Tire & Rubber Company and National Tire & Rubber Company. An orcharding industry also started during this period, as large storage and preserving facilities made East Palestine the leading city for orchards in the area.

East Palestine became a qualified Tree City USA as recognized by the National Arbor Day Foundation in 2004. Its municipal status was reclassified to a village in 2011, following its population falling below 5,000 in the 2010 census.

=== 2023 train derailment ===
On February 3, 2023, an explosion and fire occurred following the derailment of a Norfolk Southern freight train carrying hazardous chemicals on the eastern end of town. A state of emergency was declared by the village council on February 4. An evacuation area was extended by Ohio Governor Mike DeWine on February 6 to allow for "a controlled release of vinyl chloride" and burning it in a nearby trench. Some residents subsequently started a class-action lawsuit against Norfolk Southern, citing new respiratory issues and unknown environmental impacts. Contamination remained in many buildings closest to the train wreckage for over a year.

== Geography ==
East Palestine is located along the eastern boundary of Columbiana County, almost touching Darlington Township, Pennsylvania. The village is part of Unity Township.

According to the United States Census Bureau, East Palestine has a total area of 3.15 square miles (8.16 km^{2}), all land. Two streams pass through the village; Leslie Run and Sulphur Run.

== Demographics ==
Historical population
Census	Pop.	Note	%±
1880	1,047		—
1890	1,816		73.4%
1900	2,493		37.3%
1910	3,537		41.9%
1920	5,750		62.6%
1930	5,215		−9.3%
1940	5,123		−1.8%
1950	5,195		1.4%
1960	5,232		0.7%
1970	5,604		7.1%
1980	5,306		−5.3%
1990	5,168		−2.6%
2000	4,917		−4.9%
2010	4,721		−4.0%
2020	4,761		0.8%
2023 (est.)	4,658	▼	−2.2%
U.S. Decennial Census

=== 2020 census ===
As of the 2020 census, East Palestine had a population of 4,761. The median age was 42.0 years. 22.6% of residents were under the age of 18 and 20.5% of residents were 65 years of age or older. For every 100 females there were 97.7 males, and for every 100 females age 18 and over there were 93.9 males age 18 and over.

92.4% of residents lived in urban areas, while 7.6% lived in rural areas.

There were 1,932 households in East Palestine, of which 29.2% had children under the age of 18 living in them. Of all households, 44.5% were married-couple households, 18.7% were households with a male householder and no spouse or partner present, and 26.9% were households with a female householder and no spouse or partner present. About 28.7% of all households were made up of individuals and 12.8% had someone living alone who was 65 years of age or older.

There were 2,131 housing units, of which 9.3% were vacant. The homeowner vacancy rate was 1.9% and the rental vacancy rate was 9.6%.

Racial composition as of the 2020 census
Race	Number	Percent
White	4,457	93.6%
Black or African American	33	0.7%
American Indian and Alaska Native	13	0.3%
Asian	16	0.3%
Native Hawaiian and Other Pacific Islander	1	0.0%
Some other race	28	0.6%
Two or more races	213	4.5%
Hispanic or Latino (of any race)	74	1.6%

=== 2010 census ===
As of the census of 2010, there were 4,721 people, 1,898 households, and 1,282 families living in the city. The population density was 1,498.7 inhabitants per square mile (578.7/km^{2}). There were 2,125 housing units at an average density of 674.6 per square mile (260.5/km^{2}). The racial makeup of the city was 98.2% White, 0.2% African American, 0.1% Native American, 0.3% Asian, 0.4% from other races, and 0.7% from two or more races. Hispanic or Latino of any race were 0.9% of the population.

There were 1,898 households, of which 29.7% had children under the age of 18 living with them, 49.4% were married couples living together, 13.3% had a female householder with no husband present, 4.8% had a male householder with no wife present, and 32.5% were non-families. 27.3% of all households were made up of individuals, and 11.3% had someone living alone who was 65 years of age or older. The average household size was 2.46, and the average family size was 2.95.

The median age in the city was 40.7 years. 23.1% of residents were under the age of 18; 7.6% were between the ages of 18 and 24; 24.3% were from 25 to 44; 28.5% were from 45 to 64; and 16.5% were 65 years of age or older. The gender makeup of the city was 49.0% male and 51.0% female.

=== 2000 census ===
As of the census of 2000, there were 4,917 people, 1,975 households, and 1,384 families living in the city. The population density was 1,772.1 inhabitants per square mile (684.2/km^{2}). There were 2,108 housing units at an average density of 759.7 per square mile (293.3/km^{2}). The racial makeup of the city was 98.47% White, 0.37% African American, 0.06% Native American, 0.14% Asian, 0.26% from other races, and 0.69% from two or more races. Hispanic or Latino of any race were 0.71% of the population.

There were 1,975 households, out of which 30.9% had children under the age of 18 living with them, 54.6% were married couples living together, 11.6% had a female householder with no husband present, and 29.9% were non-traditional families. 25.6% of all households were made up of individuals, and 14.1% had someone living alone who was 65 years of age or older. The average household size was 2.49, and the average family size was 2.98.

In the city, the population was spread out, with 24.9% under the age of 18, 7.5% from 18 to 24, 28.4% from 25 to 44, 22.6% from 45 to 64, and 16.7% who were 65 years of age or older. The median age was 38 years. For every 100 females, there were 93.2 males. For every 100 females aged 18 and over, there were 87.5 males.

The median income for a household in the city was $35,738, and the median income for a family was $40,057. Males had a median income of $30,550 versus $17,237 for females. The per capita income for the city was $16,243. About 5.5% of families and 10.0% of the population were below the poverty line, including 22.0% of those under age 18 and 2.2% of those aged 65 or over.

== Government ==
East Palestine operates under a chartered council–manager government; there are six council members elected as a legislature and a mayor who serves as the council's president. All are elected for four-year terms. The council employs a village manager for administration. As of 2025, the mayor was Trent R. Conaway and the village manager was Antonio Diaz-Guy.

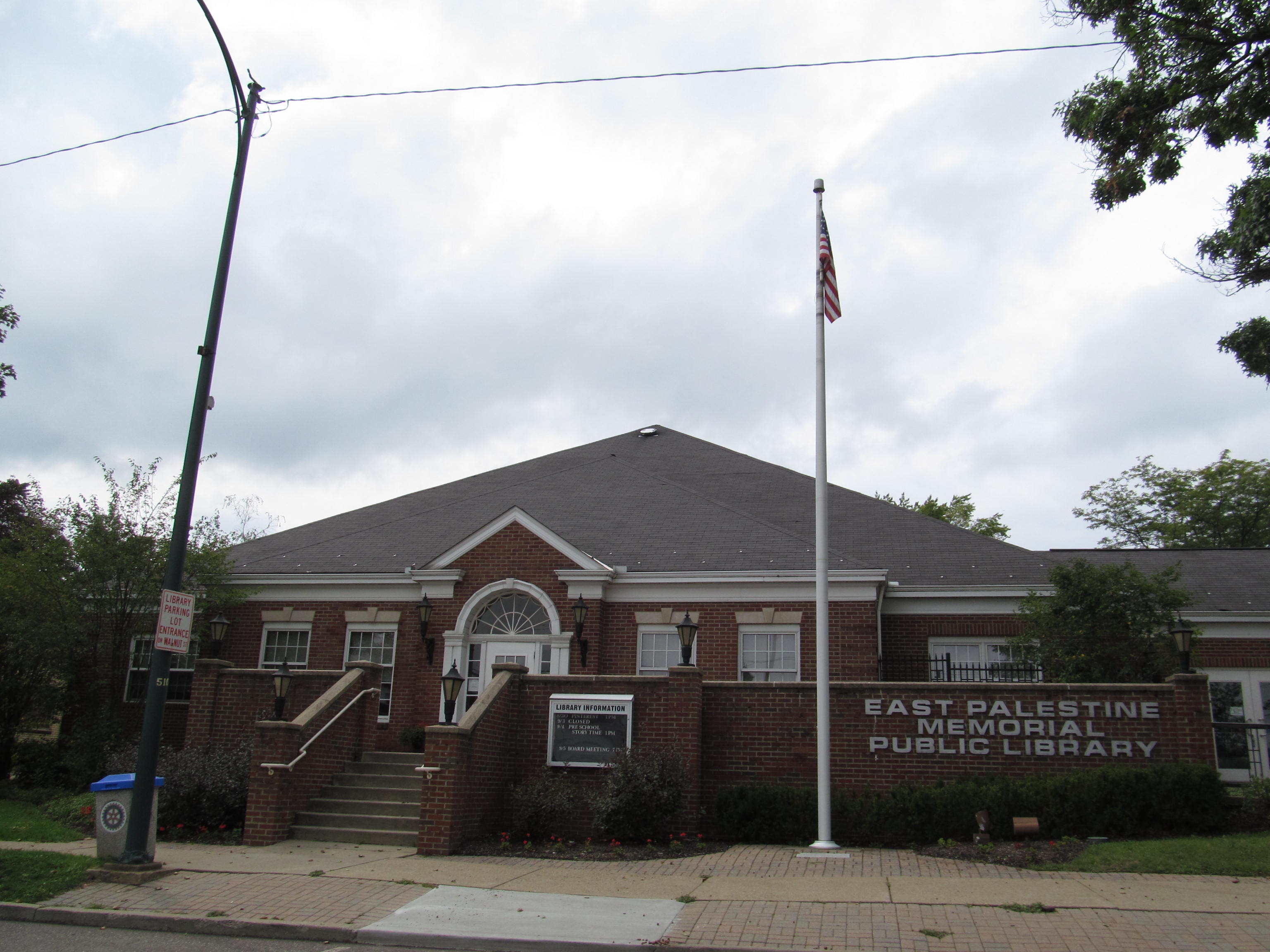
East Palestine Memorial Public Library

== Education ==
The East Palestine City School District serves children in the village, which includes one elementary school, one middle school, and East Palestine High School. The district formerly operated multiple schools throughout the city; a new middle school and a renovated elementary campus were built surrounding the existing high school in 1997. The village is home to a public library which opened in 1920.

== Transportation ==
State Route 170 runs north–south through East Palestine. State Route 165 enters the village westbound from Pennsylvania as Taggart Street before entering a concurrency with SR 170, and then travels northbound as Market Street. The concurrent SR 165/SR 170 accesses State Route 46 running to the north of East Palestine. State Route 558 runs east–west through and terminates within the village.

Norfolk Southern Railway's Fort Wayne Line passes through East Palestine.

== Notable residents ==
- Linda Bolon, member of the Ohio House of Representatives from the 1st district
- Sarah Burgess, singer-songwriter, contestant on American Idol
- Charles Burleigh Galbreath, writer, historian, educator, and librarian
- Nelson S. Dilworth, member of the California State Legislature
- R. S. Hamilton, 33rd speaker of the Oregon House of Representatives
- Wynn Hawkins, Major League Baseball pitcher
- Martha Hill, dance instructor at the Juilliard School and advocate of modern dance
- Fred Hoaglin, National Football League center
- Roger M. Kyes, fourth United States Deputy Secretary of Defense
- Crystal Mackall, physician and immunologist
- Jerry McGee, PGA Tour professional golfer
- J. T. Miller, National Hockey League left winger
- George Morris, National Football League halfback
- Jesse R. Pitts, sociologist
- Volney Rogers, founder of Mill Creek Park
- R. J. Thomas, third president of the United Automobile Workers
- Louise Merwin Young, writer and lecturer
