= Royal China Company =

Former American ceramics manufacturer

- Company type: Private
- Industry: Ceramics
- Founded: 1934; 92 years ago
- Defunct: 1986; 40 years ago
- Headquarters: Sebring, Ohio, U.S.
- Area served: Worldwide

The Royal China Company was a ceramics manufacturer in Sebring, Ohio, United States. It was established in 1934 and ceased operations in 1986.

== History ==
Royal China Company was established in 1934 when Beatrice Miller, William H. Habenstreit, and John Bert Briggs purchased the former E. H. Sebring China Company plant on South 15th Street in Sebring, Ohio (formerly the Oliver China Company building). Six months after the purchase, the company had 125 persons on the payroll and produced 7,800,000 pieces in the first year of operation. Beatrice Miller became president in 1946, and the company had 700 employees in 1950.

Royal China produced over 1,700 ceramics patterns. They were well known for producing dishes with prints from Currier and Ives, as well as Memory Lane, Colonial Homestead, Old Curiosity Shop, Willow Ware, Fair Oaks, and Bucks County patterns. Their mission was to make affordable china that was sold in grocery stores, five-and-dime stores, catalog mail-order houses, and was often used as promotional items by other companies, such as S&H Green Stamps. During the early 1950s, a 20-piece set could be purchased for less than $6. In 1966, a 53-piece "Ironstone" service of eight could be purchased for $18.88.

In 1962 the company bought out the defunct W. S. George Pottery Company, and purchased the French-Saxon China Company in 1964, making them the largest unionized china manufacturer in the United States with $6 million in sales. Beatrice Miller retired in 1969, at which point the plant was sold to the Jeannette Glass Company. The plant was rebuilt after a fire on February 15, 1970, after which they continued to produce dinnerware, with 81 different patterns and over 30,000,000 pieces with sales of around $16 million. This made them the third-largest china manufacturer in the United States at the time. Later the company was sold to Coca-Cola Bottling, then an investment group, The J Corporation, and once again by the Nordic Capital Corporation in April 1984.

Production ceased in 1986 when Bank One auctioned off the plant's contents. What was left of the plant caught fire in 2010 and the remaining buildings were demolished. Cleanup of the site, which contained contaminated soil, began after being purchased by Michael Conny in 2020.
