= East Palestine High School =

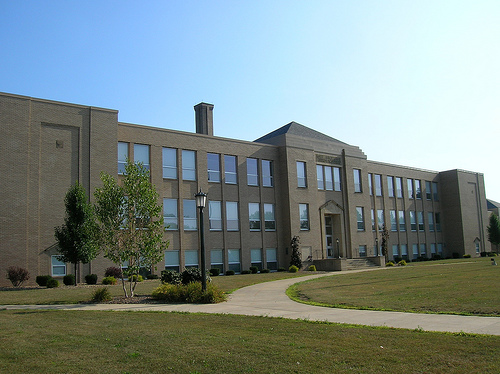

Location
- 360 West Grant Street; East Palestine, Columbiana, Ohio 44413-1664; United States
- 40°50′23″N 80°32′47″W

Information
- Type: Public high school
- Established: 1876
- School district: East Palestine City School District
- NCES District ID: 3904392
- Educational authority: Ohio Department of Education
- Superintendent: Dr. James Rook
- School code: OH-043927-009134
- CEEB code: 362035
- NCES School ID: 390439200878
- Principal: Dwayne Pavkovich
- Teaching staff: 18.00 (on an FTE basis)
- Grades: 9-12
- Gender: Coeducational
- Enrollment: 269 (2024-2025)
- Student to teacher ratio: 14.94
- Campus type: Town: Fringe
- Colors: Brown and White
- Athletics conference: Eastern Ohio Athletic Conference
- Nickname: Bulldogs
- USNWR ranking: 11,916
- Newspaper: The Epic
- Yearbook: Ephanian
- Website: myepschools.org/o/ephs

East Palestine High School is a public high school in East Palestine, Ohio, United States. It is the only high school in the East Palestine City School District. Athletic teams are known as the Bulldogs and compete as a member of the Ohio High School Athletic Association in the Eastern Ohio Athletic Conference.

== History ==
East Palestine City School District was established following an act of the Ohio General Assembly in March 1875. The first school opened in the fall of 1876, and the first graduating class was in 1885. The current high school was built in 1936. A new gymnasium was constructed in the late 1990s and in 1999, the high school was renovated after a levy was passed.

== Academics ==
East Palestine High School offers courses in the traditional American curriculum. Entering their third and fourth years, students can elect to attend the Columbiana County Career and Technical Center in Lisbon as either a part-time or full-time student.

== Notable alumni ==
- Wynn Hawkins – former professional baseball pitcher in the Major League Baseball (MLB)
- J. T. Miller – professional ice hockey player in the National Hockey League (NHL)
- Fred Hoaglin – former professional football player in the National Football League (NFL)
