= Grinnell Pioneers =

- University: Grinnell College
- Nickname: Pioneers
- NCAA: Division III
- Conference: Midwest Conference
- Athletic director: Holly Roepke
- Location: Grinnell, Iowa
- Varsity teams: 20 (10 men's, 10 women's)
- Football stadium: Rosenbloom Field
- Basketball arena: Darby Gymnasium
- Baseball stadium: Pioneer Park
- Soccer stadium: Springer Field
- Colors: Black and scarlet
- Website: pioneers.grinnell.edu

The Grinnell College varsity sports teams are named the Pioneers. They participate in twenty intercollegiate sports at the NCAA Division III level and in the Midwest Conference. Grinnell was previously in the Missouri Valley Conference.

Nearly one-third of recent Grinnell graduates participated in at least one of 20 varsity sports while attending the college and the college has led the Midwest Conference in the total number of Academic All-Conference honorees in 9 of the last 10 years.

== Varsity sports ==
Men's sports	Women's sports
Baseball	Basketball
Basketball	Cross country
Cross country	Golf
Football	Soccer
Golf	Softball
Soccer	Swimming
Swimming	Tennis
Tennis	Track and field
Track and field	Volleyball

=== Basketball ===
In February 2005, Grinnell became the first Division III school featured in a regular season basketball game by the ESPN network family in 30 years when it faced off against the Beloit Buccaneers on ESPN2. Grinnell lost 86-85. Grinnell College's basketball team attracted ESPN due to the team's run and gun style of playing basketball, also known as the Grinnell System. Coach Dave Arseneault's "system" incorporates a continual full-court press, a fast-paced offense, an emphasis on offensive rebounding, a barrage of three-point shots and substitutions of five players at a time every 35 to 40 seconds. This allows a higher average playing time for more players than the "starters" and suits the Division III goals of scholar-athletes. "The System" has been criticized for not teaching the principles of defense. However, under "The System," Grinnell has won three conference championships over the past ten years and have regularly placed in the top half of the conference. Arseneault's teams have set numerous NCAA scoring records and several individuals on the Grinnell team have led the nation in scoring or assists.

On November 19, 2011 Grinnell player Griffin Lentsch set a Division III individual scoring record in a game against Principia College. The 6-foot 4-inch guard scored 89 points, besting the old record of 77, also set by Pioneers player Jeff Clement in 1998. Lentsch made 27 of his 55 shots, including 15 three-pointers as Grinnell won the high-scoring game 145 to 97.

On November 20, 2012 Grinnell's Jack Taylor broke Lentsch's scoring record—as well as the records for NCAA and collegiate scoring—in a 179–104 victory over Faith Baptist Bible. Taylor scored 138 points, besting the previous NCAA record of 113. Taylor scored 109 points in a November 2013 game against Crossroads College to become the first player in NCAA history to have two 100-point games.

=== Cross country ===
Through 2013, the Grinnell men's cross country team won 25 out of 27 Midwest Conference cross country championships and produced 18 individual Midwest Conference champions. The women's cross country team won 8 of the 11 Midwest Conference titles.

=== Football ===
Grinnell's football program started in 1889, when the Pioneers beat the University of Iowa 24–0. The match was held on November 16, 1889 in Grinnell and was the first game of intercollegiate football played west of the Mississippi River. A marker on Abe H. Rosenbloom Field, where Grinnell College's football team now plays, commemorates this event.

== Track and field ==
Both the Grinnell men's and women's track and field teams have won several indoor and outdoor championships since 1909.

== Club sports ==
In addition to the varsity sports, Grinnell has several club sports teams that compete in non-varsity sports such as sailing, water polo, ultimate, and rugby union. The Men's Water Polo club team, the Wild Turkeys, were runners-up in the 2007 Division III Collegiate National Club Championships organized by the CWPA in Lindenwood University, St. Louis. The Men's Ultimate team, nicknamed the Grinnellephants, qualified in 2008 for its first Division III National Championship in Versailles, Ohio. The Women's Ultimate team, nicknamed The Sticky Tongue Frogs, tied for third place in the 2010 Division III National Championship in Appleton, Wisconsin. The success was repeated in 2011 when the men's team placed third in 2011 Division III National Championship in Buffalo.
