= List of basketball players who have scored 100 points in a single game =

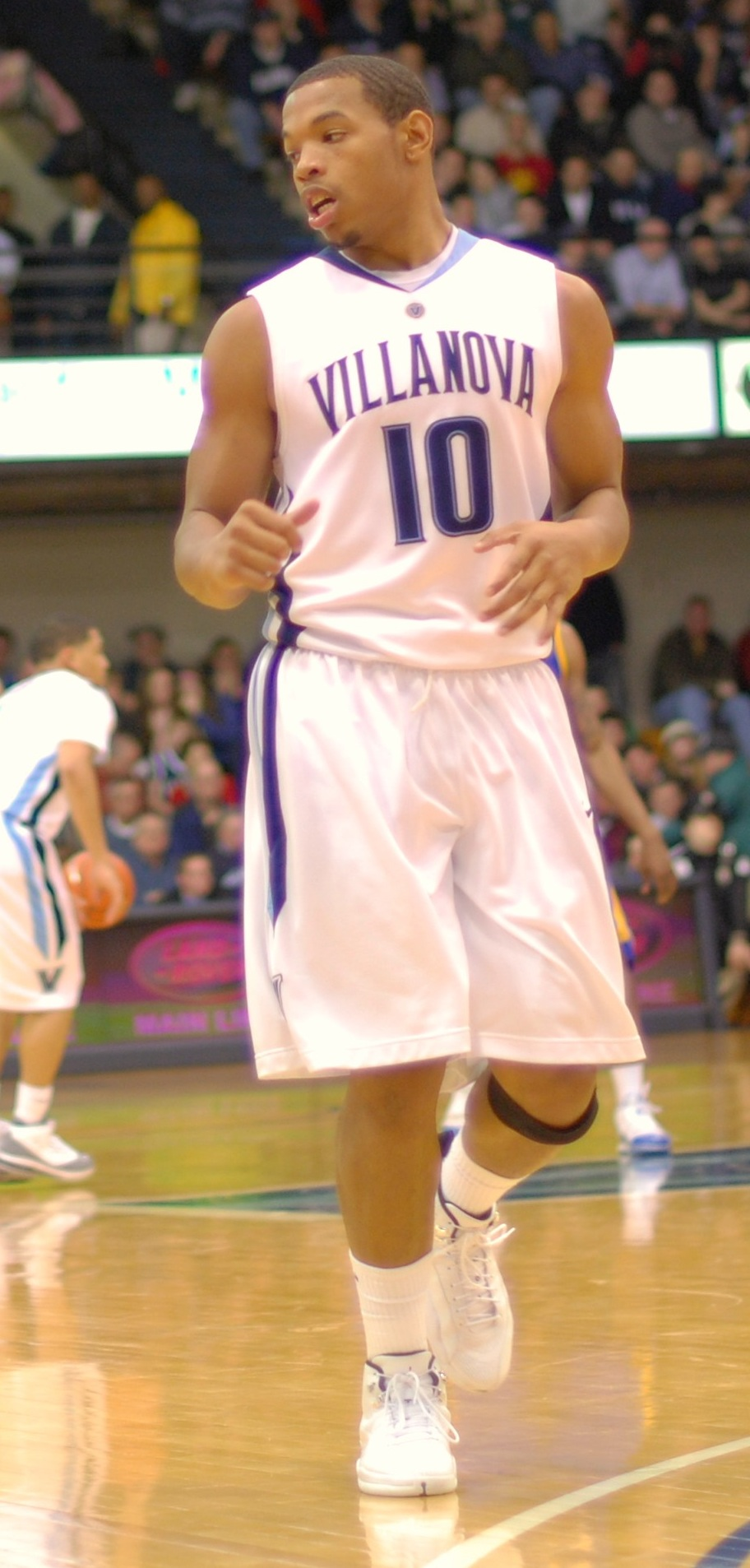
On August 7, 2010, Corey Fisher scored 105 points during a semi-professional summer league game.

In basketball, points are the sum of the score accumulated through field goals (two or three points) and free throws (one point). It is a rare achievement for an individual player to score 100 points in a single game. What follows is an incomplete list of all of the verified occurrences of players scoring 100 points or more. Each individual instance of the accomplishment may have been achieved under varying circumstances, such as game length, opponent skill level and the league in which it occurred.

Internationally, the highest single player total between national teams is 116 points, scored by the Philippines' Lou Salvador in May 1923 against China. It happened during the 1923 Far Eastern Games. The highest single game total in worldwide organized basketball history, irrespective of gender, age or competition level, is 272 points, scored by a 13-year-old boy named Mats Wermelin of Sweden. He recorded every single point in his team's 272–0 win on February 5, 1974, during a regional boys' tournament held in Stockholm. As an adult, Wermelin played as a guard for Hammarby IF, Järfälla and Stockholm Capitals. The highest total by a female basketball player worldwide is 136, scored by Anat Draigor of Israel. It happened on April 5, 2006, in a 158–41 win. Draigor was 46 years old playing in an Israel Division III League playoff game, which also makes her the oldest player in history to score 100 points. Three players, including the United States' Bevo Francis and Jack Taylor, have recorded multiple 100-point games in organized competition. Croatia's Marin Ferenčević scored 101 and 178 points in April and May 2006, respectively, during Under-14 Croatian League matches.

In the United States, 100-point games have occurred at least once at most levels of education. At the middle school level, 13-year-old 8th grader Bob Harrison scored all 139 of his team's points in a 139–8 win on February 3, 1941. In high school, there have been 27 verified occurrences, 20 by male players and seven by female players. The first recorded instance was in 1913, when Herman Saygar of Culver High School (Indiana) scored 113 points against Winamac High School. The first female to score 100 points at the high school level was Denise Long of Union-Whitten High School (Iowa), who scored 111 points during a state playoff game in the spring of 1968 against Dows High School. That season, Long's senior year of 1967–68, she averaged a still-standing national record 68.2 points per game. Her single game total stood as the high school female record for 38 years until Epiphanny Prince scored 113 for Murry Bergtraum High School (New York) on February 2, 2006. The boys' high school record is 135 points, scored by Danny Heater on January 26, 1960. Playing for Burnsville High School (West Virginia) against Widen High School, Heater made 53 of 70 field goals and 29 of 41 free throws. His 135-point outburst is still the highest total for the high school level worldwide.

At the college level, there have been seven 100-point games, two of which were recorded by Clarence "Bevo" Francis of Rio Grande College and two by Jack Taylor of Grinnell College. Francis scored 116 points against Ashland College on January 9, 1953, but the opponent was not a four-year institution, so the total did not count as the official college record. One year later, on February 2, 1954, Francis scored 113 against Hillsdale College, which was the recognized highest total in United States college basketball history for 59 years; Grinnell's Taylor scored 138 points on November 20, 2012 to set the new all-time NCAA all-divisions mark. He again recorded 100+ points on November 17, 2013 when he scored 109 against Crossroads College. Frank Selvy of Furman University is the only player to score 100 points at the Division I level. Selvy recorded exactly 100 points on February 13, 1954—less than two weeks after Francis scored 113—against Newberry College. He scored his 99th and 100th points on a 40-foot shot as the final buzzer sounded.

Professionally, there have been a number of occurrences of 100-point games worldwide. It has only happened once in the United States, however. Wilt Chamberlain of the National Basketball Association's Philadelphia Warriors scored 100 points on March 2, 1962 against the New York Knicks during a game played at Hersheypark Arena in Hershey, Pennsylvania. He made 36-of-63 field goals and 28-of-32 free throws, the latter being a particularly unusual statistic considering Chamberlain was a 51.1% free throw shooter for his career.

== Key ==
Most of the players' exact statistics cannot be found, but whatever information was able to be verified is included. When a dash (—) appears in the three-point field goal statistic, it indicates that three-pointers had yet to be implemented and were therefore not an applicable statistic.

FGM	Field goals made
FGA	Field goals attempted
3FGM	Three-point field goals made
3FGA	Three-point field goals attempted
FTM	Free throws made
FTA	Free throws attempted
Ref.	Reference(s)
Nationality	Denotes the player's nationality, not the country in which it occurred

†	Denotes female player
*	Elected to the Naismith Memorial Basketball Hall of Fame (United States)
‡	Elected to both the Naismith Hall and the Women's Basketball Hall of Fame (United States)
Player (X)	Denotes the number of times the player has scored 100 points up to and including that occurrence

== Worldwide ==
Points	Nationality	Player	Date	Team	Opponent	Final score	FGM	FGA	3FGM	3FGA	FTM	FTA	Notes	Ref.
272	Sweden	Mats Wermelin	February 5, 1974			272–0			—	—			According to Guinness World Records, Wermelin, a 13-year-old boy, scored all 272 points in the shutout win in Stockholm during a regional boys tournament.	
227	Poland	Konrad Migdalski	December 2005	MKS-MOS Pruszków	UKS Czarodzieje z Bielan	326–15							He scored 100 points 3 minutes before end of 2nd quarter. The game was a local U-14 Polish league match.	
178	Croatia	Marin Ferenčević	May 2006	KK Virovitica	ABN Graminea	187–70	67	86	9	14	17	18	He also grabbed 22 rebounds and had 16 steals in the contest. The game was a local U-14 Croatian league match. His scoring by quarter went: 34, 61, 55, 28.	
153	Turkey	Erman Kunter	March 12, 1988	Fenerbahçe	Hilalspor	175–101							Kunter scored 81 points in the first half and 72 in the second half and set the Turkish Basketball League record.	
145	Greece	Aristeidis Moumoglou	July 13, 1972	Iraklis	VAO	172–94			—	—			Scored in a Greek Basket League game.	
144	Yugoslavia	Zdenko Babić	October 10, 1985	KK Zadar	APOEL	192–116							Scored in the first round of the 1985–86 FIBA Korać Cup. It only took 26 minutes (of the 40-minute game) for Babić to score 113 points.	
142	Taiwan	Lin Yi-huei	October 24, 2023	Taichung City	Kinmen County	164–182			46				Scored in The National Games Tainan City 2023.	
136^{†}	Israel	Anat Draigor	April 5, 2006	Hapoel Mate Yehuda	Elitzur Givat Shmuel	158–41							Draigor's total is recognized by Guinness World Records as the highest single game point total in women's professional basketball history. When she accomplished the feat, she was a 46-year-old mother and playing in an Israel Division III League playoff game. She scored 61 first-half points and 75 second-half points.	
136	Taiwan	Lo Yu-chun	October 24, 2023	Kinmen County	Taichung City	182–164			42				Scored in The National Games Tainan City 2023.	
134	Poland	Leszek Doliński	December 18, 1993	ATS Koszalin	Gajjal Choszczno								Scored during a III Liga (3rd division) game. Doliński was a former Polish National Team player. Record in Polish senior leagues.	
129	Brazil	Marx Martins Rodrigues Carvalho	September 16, 1984	CR Vasco da Gama	Hebraica Sociedade Cultural Esportiva e Recreativa								Scored in a Rio de Janeiro State Championship game.	
129	Poland	Krzysztof Jakóbczyk	January 22, 2007	AWF Wrocław	WSH Wrocław								During local academic league game.	
126	Philippines	Julian Macoy	September 21, 1958	University of San Carlos	Cebu School of Arts and Trades	152–80							Scored in a Cebu Collegiate Athletic Association (CCAA) game. Macoy played 33 minutes in this game. Macoy's 126-point output remains the all-time highest scoring mark ever for a Filipino player. In addition, Macoy is also the only Filipino player to score 100 points or more on more than one occasion.	
124	Great Britain	Paul Ogden	March 9, 1982	St. Alban's School	South Chadderton School	226–82							Scored at the British high school level.	
124	Australia	Anthony Pane	September 2026			160–55			38				Played in the Whittlesea City Basketball Association, a men's recreation league in Whittlesea, Victoria.	
124^{†}	Brazil	Hortência Marcari^{‡}	1987	Minercal		252–31							The game was played at São Paulo State College, which was the location of a city tournament.	
120	Philippines	Clark Quijano	October 2013	AMA University High School	Lord's Grace Christian School	166–85							Set a new Philippine high school record during the Mariano Bondoc Cup.	
116	Philippines	Lou Salvador	May 1923	Philippines national team	China national team				—	—			Achieved in the gold medal game at the 1923 Far Eastern Games and still remains the highest single game total in international competition.	
116	United States	Archie Talley	1980	TV Clausen	Trier	132–91							Scored during a game in Germany.	
113	Lebanon	Mohammad Akkari	April 3, 2012	Al Mouttahed Tripoli	Bejje SC	173–141	40	69	32	59	1		This was the first 100-point performance in any official game of any league in a FIBA Asia member country. El Akkari had only been averaging 7.6 points per game until this game.	
112	Philippines	Felix Duhig	1989	Cebu Institute of Technology	Cebu School of Arts and Trades								Scored in a Cebu Amateur Athletic Association (CAAA) game. Duhig made 30 three-point shots in this game.	
112	Yugoslavia	Dražen Petrović*	October 5, 1985	Cibona Zagreb	SMELT Olimpija	158–77	40	60	10	20	22	22	Scored in a Yugoslav First League game.	
112	Taiwan	Chou Hai-jung	October 28, 1988	Taipei City	Chiayi City	150–60	50		9		3		Scored in The National Games 1988.	
112	Hungary	Soma Balla	October 12, 2026	Morgan Stanley Charging Bulls	UNIQA	183–39	48		14		2	2	Scored in a game of the Üzleti Kosárliga, a corporate league in Budapest in which teams represent their employers. The game was played with a 4×10-minute running clock. Balla attempted only two free throws all game, both following and-one field goals; his team scored 183 points in total. He broke the league record of 65 points held by Dávid Dinnyés.	
111	Canada	Denham Brown	February 7, 2002	West Hill Collegiate Institute	R. H. King Academy	150–58			13				He set the Canadian high school single game record. Brown scored 51 first half points and 41 in the third quarter alone.	
111	Croatia	Matej Kuna	February 2006	Belišće	Požega	159–77			20	26			Matej was a 21-year-old playing in the Croatian A2 League and fell two points shy of breaking Dražen Petrović's record of 112. He thought he had broken the record and substituted out with 90 seconds remaining, but officials later revealed he had "only" scored 111.	
110	Kosovo	Granit Rugova	March 30, 2011	Sigal Prishtina	KB Mitrovica	150–54							Highest total in Kosovar basketball history.	
107	Nicaragua	Derick Omeir Wilson	1978	Bluefields Selection	National School of Agriculture								Set a Nicaraguan national scoring record.	
105	United States	Tony Harris	October 10, 1992	Swift Premiums	Ginebra San Miguel	152–147							Harris broke Michael Hackett's seven-year-old Philippine Basketball Association record, which still stands to this day.	
104	Philippines	Jeron Teng	January 5, 2011	Xavier School	Grace Christian College	164–74	37	70	1		29	34	Set a then-Philippine high school record (later broken in October 2013).	
103	United States	Michael Hackett	November 21, 1985	Ginebra San Miguel	Great Taste	197–168							Set a then-Philippine Basketball Association record.	
103	Finland	Nantii Ruuhilahti	March 21, 2026	WB Pantterit	BC Nokia	186–77	42	59	3	4	16	23	Occurred in the Under-19 Finnish Basketball Championship league, breaking the Finnish basketball record for most points in a single game. Ruuhilahti also recorded eight rebounds, five steals, and two assists.	
102	Russian Federation	Danila Kukuruzov	January 20, 2018	BaltB	Mining University	147–78	44	59	0	2	14	21		
101	United States	Kevin Bradshaw	1993	M. M. Giv'at Shmuel	Maccabi Tverya	165–109							Scored during a Liga Leumit (Division 2) game towards the beginning of the 1993–94 season. Previously, in college, Bradshaw set the NCAA Division I single game scoring record with 72 points.	
101	United States	J. J. Eubanks	October 9, 1994	Maccabi Ramat Gan	Beitar Ramat Gan	161–66	40	57	9	22	12	14	Scored during an Israeli Basketball Super League (Division 1) game. Due to financing issues, Beitar Ramat Gan played with youth players all season long, allowing several records, including this, to be set against them.	
101	Croatia	Marin Ferenčević (2)	April 2006	KK Virovitica	Bjelovar								Ferenčević, 13 at the time, is the son of ex-basketball player Branko Ferenčević.	
101	Philippines	Julian Macoy (2)	September 15, 1957	University of San Carlos	Cebu Normal School	135–63							Scored in a Cebu Collegiate Athletic Association (CCAA) game. Macoy played 29 minutes in this game. Macoy is also the only Filipino player to score 100 points or more on more than one occasion.	
100	United States	Danny Shouse	December 1, 1979	Ármann	Skallagrímur	118–109							Scored during an Icelandic Division I game.	
100	Croatia	Veljko Petranović	October 8, 2003	Postojna	Vipava	150–49							Set during Spar pokal. Petranović was 43 years old and played only three quarters.	
100	Poland	Borys Klimek	November 28, 2014	Stal Ostrów Wielkopolski	KT Kosz Kalisz	165–86							He played 32 minutes. The game was a local U-20 Polish league match.	
100	Philippines	Lucio Tan Jr.	1996	Triton Securities	Phil Stock Exchange								Set during the Philippines Stock Exchange Basketball Tournament semi-finals. He later repeated the feat in 1997 Class of '83 vs. Class of '82 at the St. Jude Catholic School Alumni Tournament semi-finals.	
100	United States	Jonathan Braeger	March 12, 2022	Baskets Vilsbiburg	s.Oliver Würzburg Akademie	209–39	15	17	22	34	4	5	Set during a German 1. Regionalliga game; also had a quadruple-double. Several players from both teams where absent due to illness. Unhappy with the game not being postponed, the Würzburg players played limited defense during the game and were down to three players in the final quarter.	

== United States ==
=== Professional ===
National Basketball Association (NBA)

Points	Player	Date	Team	Opponent	Final score	FGM	FGA	3FGM	3FGA	FTM	FTA	Notes	Ref.
100	Wilt Chamberlain*	March 2, 1962	Philadelphia Warriors	New York Knicks	169–147	36	63	—	—	28	32	Also grabbed 25 rebounds in the performance.	

=== Collegiate ===
Points	Player	Date	Team	Opponent	Final score	FGM	FGA	3FGM	3FGA	FTM	FTA	Notes	Ref.
138	Jack Taylor	November 20, 2012	Grinnell College	Faith Baptist	179–104	52	108	27	71	7	10	Taylor set the NCAA all-division scoring record in the fast-paced Grinnell offense.	
116	Clarence "Bevo"; Francis	January 9, 1953	Rio Grande College	Ashland College	150–85	47		—	—	22		Initially recognized by both the National Association of Intercollegiate Athletics (NAIA) and the National Collegiate Athletic Association (NCAA) as a college record, public uproar eventually forced NCAA to throw out the record because it did not occur in a game against a four-year institution. He had 61 points in the first half and scored all of his team's points, a total of 55, in the fourth quarter.	
113	Clarence "Bevo" Francis (2)	February 2, 1954	Rio Grande College	Hillsdale College	134–91	38	70	—	—	37	45	Francis also set college records for field goals made and free throws made.	
109	Jack Taylor (2)	November 17, 2013	Grinnell College	Crossroads College	173–123	35	70	24	48	15	17	Occurred in the second game of the season. Scored 71 in the game before.	
100+	Paul Arizin*		Villanova University					—	—			Similar to Bevo Francis's games, this is not officially recognized by the NCAA due to it being played against a junior college.	
100	J.J. Culver	December 10, 2019	Wayland Baptist University	Southwestern Adventist University	124–60	34	62	12	33	20	27	The second occurrence of a 100-point game at the NAIA level.	
100	Frank Selvy	February 13, 1954	Furman University	Newberry College	149–95	41	66	—	—	18	22	The only occurrence of a 100-point game at the NCAA Division I level. He scored his 99th and 100th points on a 40-foot shot as the final buzzer sounded.	

=== High school ===
Since 1913, 21 male and seven female players have scored 100 points or more in United States high school basketball games.

Points	Player	Date	High school (state)	Opponent	Final score	FGM	FGA	3FGM	3FGA	FTM	FTA	Notes	Ref.
135	Danny Heater	January 26, 1960	Burnsville (WV)	Widen (WV)	173–43	53	70	—	—	29	41	Heater set the world record for high school-level single game scoring, not just the United States' record. He scored 85 points in the second half alone, including 55 in the final 10 minutes. Heater also collected 32 rebounds and 7 assists during the game.	
127	John Morris	February 22, 1961	Portsmouth Norcom (VA)	Mary Smith (VA)	173–47			—	—				
120	Dick Bogenrife	February 6, 1953	Sedalia-Midway (OH)	Canaan (OH)	137–47	52		—	—	16			
114	Wayne Oakley	December 21, 1954	Hanson (KY)	St. Agnes (KY)	128–56	47	55	—	—	20	24		
114	Pete Cimino	January 22, 1960	Bristol (PA)	Palisades (PA)	134–86	44	79	—	—	26	29	Cimino scored all 69 of his team's second half points.	
113	Herman Saygar	1913	Culver (IN)	Winamac (IN)	154–10	56		—	—	1			
113^{†}	Epiphanny Prince	February 2, 2006	Murry Bergtraum (NY)	Brandeis (NY)	137–32	54	60	4		1			
111^{†}	Denise Long	January 22, 1968	Union-Whitten (IA)	Dows (IA)	136–41	38		—	—	35	44	Long averaged a still-standing national record 68.2 points per game during her senior year and finished her career with 6,250 points, a then-national record for girls' high school basketball.	
108	Morris Dale Mathis	January 25, 1955	St. Joe (AR)	Witts Springs (AR)				—	—				
108	Ken Robinson	January 10, 1961	Cassatt Midway (SC)	Ruby South (SC)	130–30	48		—	—	12	13	Robinson scored 62 points in the second half.	
105	Kenneth Johnson	January 10, 1979	Grandfield (OK)	Terral (OK)	120–65	45	85	—	—			Johnson scored 71 first half points.	
105^{†}	Cheryl Miller^{‡}	January 26, 1982	Riverside Poly (CA)	Norte Vista (CA)	179–15	46	50	—	—	13	15		
104	Danny Boyd	January 6, 1961	Camden (TN)	Clarksburg (TN)	130–43	44		—	—	16		Boyd per-quarter points: 24, 31, 27, 22.	
103	Dickie Pitts	February 14, 1956	Wimauma (FL)	Admiral Farragut (FL)	123–77	48		—	—	11	14		
103	Brian Payne	February 16, 1988	New Port Richey Christian (FL)	Clearwater St. Paul (FL)	111–60	40		12		11	11	Payne per-quarter points: 29, 26, 13, 35	
102	Ed Vondra	1922	Brainard (NE)	Raymond (NE)		50		—	—	2			
102	Bennie Fuller	January 19, 1971 (Note: According to National Federation of State High School Associations, the game occurred on December 4, 1971. According to MaxPreps.com, the game occurred on January 20, 1971. Contemporaneous sources report the date as Tuesday, January 19, 1971.)	Arkansas School for the Deaf (AR)	Leola (AR)	133–58	41		—	—	20	23		
102	Nick Khatchikian	January 23, 2025	Pico Rivera Mesrobian (CA)	The Waverly School (CA)	119–25	48	60	3	6	1		California state prep record. His brother, Dylan Khatchikian, tied the national single-game assists record with 35, and also added 15 rebounds and 13 steals for a triple-double.	
101^{†}	Lisa Leslie^{‡}	February 7, 1990	Morningside (CA)	South Torrance (CA)	102–24	37	56	0	0	27	35	Leslie scored all 101 points in the first half alone; she scored 49 points in the first quarter and 52 in the second quarter. The opponent forfeited the game at halftime.	
101	Cedrick Hensley	January 16, 2001	Heritage Christian (TX)	Banff (TX)	178–28	46	59	2	5	6		Hensley coincidentally scored 101 points on the same night as Dajuan Wagner scored 100 (listed below).	
100^{†}	Dianne Campbell	January 28, 1972	Claude (TX)	Clarendon (TX)	106–19			—	—			Six-on-six basketball; Campbell did not play the last three minutes.	
100	Wayne Coward	January 24, 1961	J.C. Lynch (SC)	Brittons Neck (SC)	139–31			—	—			Coward scored 80 points in the second half.	
100	Greg Procell	January 29, 1970	Noble-Ebarb (LA)	Elizabeth (LA)	139–79			—	—				
100^{†}	Linda Page	February 15, 1981	Dobbins Tech (PA)	Mastbaum Tech (PA)	131–38	41	57	—	—	18	21		
100^{†}	Lynne Lorenzen	February 15, 1986	Ventura (IA)	Woden–Crystal Lake (IA)	126–74	43	48	—	—	14		Lorenzen scored a national prep record (boys or girls) of 6,736 points during her four-year career. Her 100-point game was during six-on-six competition.	
100	Dajuan Wagner	January 16, 2001	Camden (NJ)	Gloucester Twp. Tech (NJ)	157–67	42	60	10	15	6		Wagner set the New Jersey state prep single game scoring record en route to setting the state career scoring mark of 3,462 points. He also substituted out of the game with four minutes remaining once he reached 100.	
100	Tigran Grigoryan (Note: Name misspelled as Grigorian in the record books.)	February 11, 2003	Pico Rivera Mesrobian (CA)	Los Angeles Pacific Christian (CA)	114–47			11					
100	Adrian Stubbs	January 13, 2026	Maryvale (AZ)	Kofa (AZ)	109–25	33		6		16	23	Scored in just three quarters of play; did not play the 4th quarter.	

=== Others ===
Points	Player	Date	Team	Opponent	Final score	FGM	FGA	3FGM	3FGA	FTM	FTA	Notes	Ref.
139	Bob Harrison	February 3, 1941	LaGrange School	Arch Street School	139–8	69		—	—	1		Harrison was a 5 ft 9 in (1.75 m), 13-year old 8th grader from Toledo, Ohio. This game was played in eight-minute quarters on a regulation basketball court.	
113	Wilt Chamberlain* (2)							—	—			According to the Harvey Pollack NBA Statistical Yearbook, this occurred during an amateur league game.	
105	Corey Fisher	August 7, 2010	Dyckman	GymRatsNYC	138–130			23	28			It is believed to set a new organized street basketball scoring record, surpassing Fly Williams' previous record of 100 set back in 1978. Played at Watson Gleason Playground in the Bronx, New York City, Fisher scored 72 points by the end of the third quarter and shot 23-for-28 from three-point range.	
100	Fly Williams	Summer 1978										Set a then-record for organized street basketball during an IS8 League game in Jamaica, Queens, New York City.	

== See also ==
- List of basketball players with most career points
- List of National Basketball Association single-game scoring leaders
- List of NCAA Division I men's basketball players with 60 or more points in a game
