= Brady Heslip =

Canadian basketball player

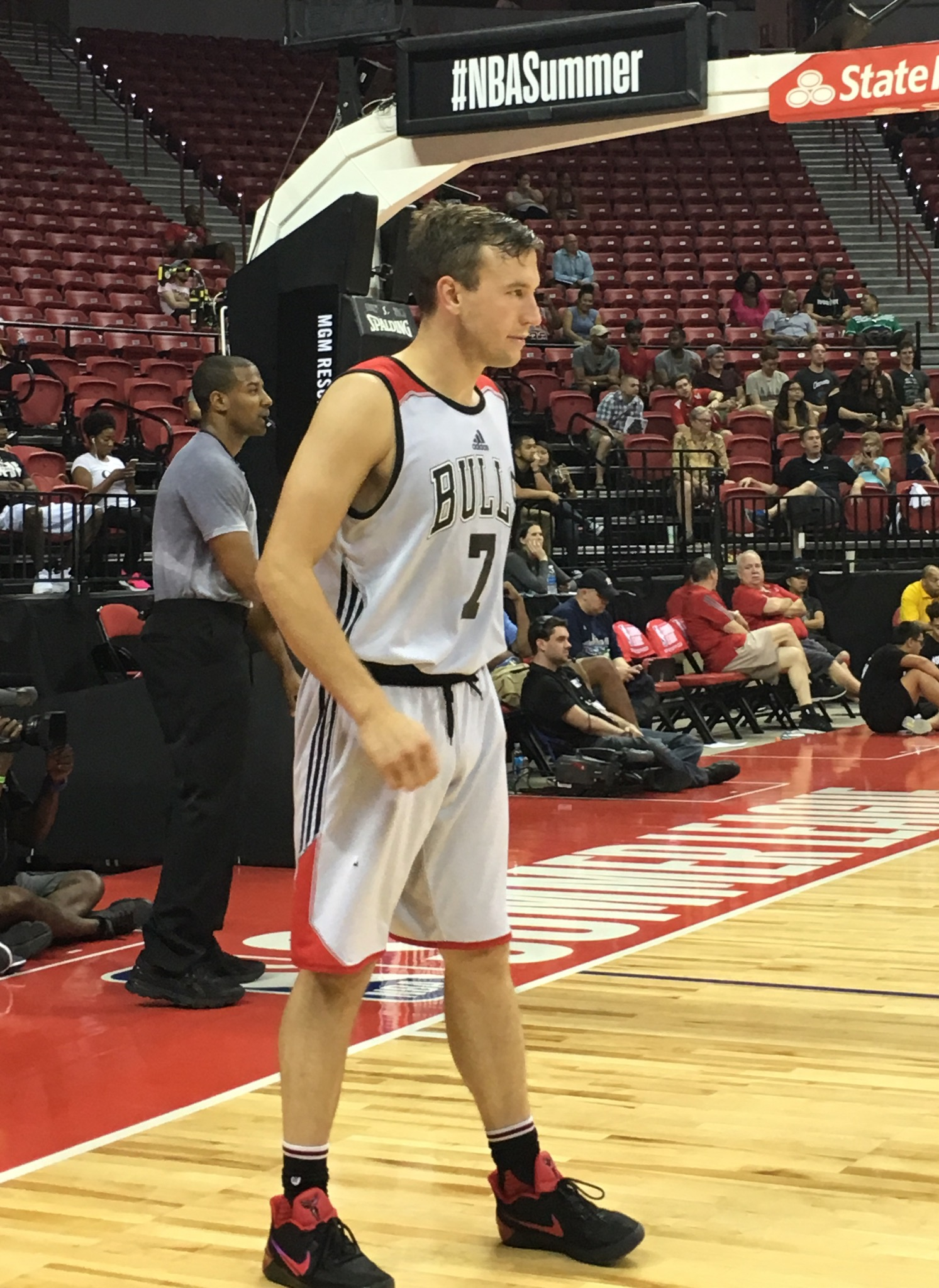
- Heslip with the Chicago Bulls at the 2017 NBA Summer League

Personal information
- Born: June 19, 1990 (age 36) Oakville, Ontario, Canada
- Listed height: 6 ft 2 in (1.88 m)
- Listed weight: 180 lb (82 kg)

Career information
- High school: Nelson (Burlington, Ontario); New Hampton School (New Hampton, New Hampshire)
- College: Baylor (2011–2014)
- NBA draft: 2014: undrafted
- Playing career: 2014–2019
- Position: Shooting guard / point guard

Career history
- 2014–2015: Reno Bighorns
- 2015: Igokea
- 2015–2016: Cantù
- 2016–2017: Raptors 905
- 2017–2018: Trabzonspor
- 2018–2019: Skyliners Frankfurt
- 2019: İstanbul BŞB

Career highlights
- NBA D-League champion (2017); Turkish League 3-Point Contest champion (2018); Bosnian League champion (2015); Republic of Srpska Cup winner (2015); Bosnian Cup winner (2015); Bosnian Cup Grand Final MVP (2015); NBA D-League single game three-point field goals record (13); NIT champion (2013)
- Stats at Basketball Reference
Medals
Men's basketball
Representing Canada
FIBA AmeriCup
Bronze medal – third place	2015 Mexico City
Pan American Games
Silver medal – second place	2015 Toronto

Brady Heslip (born June 19, 1990) is a Canadian former professional basketball player. He played college basketball for Baylor University and represents the Canadian national team. As of 2022, Heslip serves as the general manager for the Scarborough Shooting Stars of the CEBL.

== High school career ==
Heslip attended Nelson High School in Burlington, Ontario where he was a three-time Halton all-star honouree and team captain in 2008–09. As a senior, he averaged 28 points, four rebounds and four assists per game. In February 2009, he scored a school-record 54 points in Nelson's game against Notre Dame. He also earned MVP honours at the 2009 All-Canada Classic.

During the 2009 Fall semester, Heslip attended New Hampton School in New Hampton, New Hampshire where he averaged 15 points and seven rebounds before enrolling at Boston College.

== College career ==
Heslip went mostly unrecruited, receiving an offer to play from only the University of Guelph in Ontario. However, he raised his stock after a solid summer playing in the Amateur Athletic Union (AAU). In December 2009, he joined the Boston College Eagles men's basketball team where he participated in practice but did not play for them in 2009–10. In April 2010, Heslip announced his decision to transfer from Boston College.

On June 9, 2010, Heslip signed a National Letter of Intent to play for Baylor University, and subsequently sat out the 2010–11 season due to NCAA transfer regulations. During 2010–11, he was named to the Big 12 Commissioner's Honor Roll for both the fall 2010 and spring 2011 semesters.

As a redshirted sophomore in 2011–12, Heslip was named to the Big 12 All-Tournament team, Academic All-Big 12 second team, Las Vegas Classic All-Tournament team and Big 12 Commissioner's Honor Roll for both the fall 2011 and spring 2012 semesters. In 38 games (37 starts), he averaged 10.2 points, 1.3 rebounds and 1.0 assists in 27.1 minutes per game.

As a junior in 2012–13, Heslip was named to the Academic All-Big 12 first team and Big 12 Commissioner's Honor Roll for both the fall 2012 and spring 2013 semesters. On April 4, 2013, he helped Baylor win the 2013 National Invitation Tournament championship with a 74–54 win over Iowa in the final. In 36 games (all starts), he averaged 8.6 points and 1.4 rebounds in 26.3 minutes per game.

As a senior in 2013–14, Heslip played 38 games (19 starts) and averaged 11.7 points and 1.3 rebounds in 27.4 minutes per game.

== Professional career ==
=== 2014–15 season ===
After going undrafted in the 2014 NBA draft, Heslip joined the Minnesota Timberwolves for the 2014 NBA Summer League where he shot 7-for-10 on three-point field goals in five games. On September 18, 2014, he signed with the Timberwolves, but was later waived on October 25 as one of their final cuts from training camp. On November 1, 2014, he was selected by the Reno Bighorns with the 11th overall pick in the 2014 NBA Development League Draft. Playing under new Reno coach David Arseneault Jr., who was installing a fast-paced system based on his father's Grinnell System, Heslip scored 78 points and made 20 three-pointers in his first two D-League games. In his professional debut on November 14, he shot 11-of-18 to set a D-League single-game three-point shots made record against the Iowa Energy, and 15 days later he shot 13-of-20 to break his own record against the Idaho Stampede. His final game with the Bighorns came on January 18, 2015, after which he left the team in order to sign in Europe. His 13 3-point effort was eventually matched by Tyler Harvey on February 2, 2019, but As of March 3, 2022 it still stood as the league record.

On January 23, 2015, Heslip signed with Bosnian club Igokea for the remainder of the season. With Igokea, he was named the 2015 Bosnian Cup Grand Final MVP after helping his team win. In 15 Bosnian national league games for Igokea, he averaged 18.3 points, 2.6 rebounds and 1.3 assists per game. He also averaged 23.7 points in seven Adriatic League games.

=== 2015–16 season ===
In July 2015, Heslip re-joined the Minnesota Timberwolves for the 2015 NBA Summer League. On July 31, he signed with Acqua Vitasnella Cantù of Italy for the 2015–16 season. In 29 Italian national league games for Cantù, he averaged 12.7 points per game. He also averaged 16.9 points in 12 FIBA Europe Cup games.

=== 2016–17 season ===
On September 20, 2016, Heslip signed with the Toronto Raptors. However, he was later waived on October 22 after appearing in four preseason games. On October 30, he was acquired by Raptors 905, Toronto's D-League affiliate team. In 48 regular season games, he averaged 16.1 points per game, 1.9 rebounds, and 2.9 assists, while shooting 41.9% from 3-point range. In 7 D-League playoff games, Heslip averaged 14.3 points per game, 2.9 rebounds, and 2.4 assists while shooting 35.9% from 3-point range, and & would go on to win the 2017 D-League championship with them.

=== 2017–18 season ===
In July 2017, Heslip joined the Chicago Bulls for the 2017 NBA Summer League. On July 20, 2017, he signed with Turkish club Trabzonspor for the 2017–18 BSL season.

=== 2018–19 season ===
Heslip signed with the German team Skyliners Frankfurt on July 31, 2018.

== National team career ==
In 2013, Heslip was a member of the Canadian national team that competed in the World University Games, Continental Cup and FIBA Americas Championship. In July 2015, he was named to the Canadian national team roster for the 2015 Pan American Games, where he won a silver medal. He also played at the 2015 FIBA Americas Championship, where he won a bronze medal. Heslip has played in every FIBA World Cup qualifying game for team Canada.

== Post-playing career ==
On April 6, 2022, Heslip was introduced as the general manager of the Scarborough Shooting Stars of the CEBL.

== Personal life ==
Heslip is the son of Jody Triano and Tom Heslip. His father was an All-Canadian player at the University of Guelph in 1980. His uncle, Jay Triano, played for the Canadian national team for 11 years and later became the national team head coach. Jay is also the former head coach of the Toronto Raptors and is currently an assistant coach for the Portland Trail Blazers.
