= International League (disambiguation) =

The International League is an American minor league baseball organization.

International League may also refer to:

- International League of Independent Professional Base Ball Clubs, a racially-integrated baseball league that played one season in 1906
- International League (California), a high-school athletic conference in Los Angeles County, California, U.S.
- International League T20, professional cricket league
- International League Against Epilepsy
- International League against Racism and Anti-Semitism
- International League for Human Rights
- International League of Antiquarian Booksellers
- International League of Conservation Photographers, an organization in the field of conservation photography
- International League of Esperantist Radio Amateurs
- International League of Esperanto Teachers
- The International League of Dermatological Societies
- International League of Humanists, located in Sarajevo
- International League of non-religious and atheists, founded in Berlin
- Ligue internationale de la paix (International League of Peace)
- International Federation of Red Cross and Red Crescent Societies, sometimes known as the International League of Red Cross Societies
- International League of Religious Socialists
- International Alliance for Women in Music, which formed when the International League of Women Composers merged with other groups

== See also ==
- Inter-American League
