= David Arseneault =

American college basketball coach

Personal information
- Born: August 11, 1953 (age 73)

Career information
- College: Colby (1974–1976); UPEI (1976–1977); Lakehead (1977–1978)
- Position: Guard
- Coaching career: 1982–2018

Career history

Coaching
- 1982–1986: Guelph
- 1986–1987: McMaster
- 1987–1989: Hawthone
- 1989–2018: Grinnell

David Michael Arseneault (born August 12, 1953) is a former college basketball head coach. He invented the Grinnell System, a run-and-gun style that he employed with the Grinnell Pioneers. He was also an associate professor of physical education on Grinnell's faculty. Arseneault's son, David Jr., who played under his father at Grinnell, later served on his staff and eventually succeeded him as Pioneers head coach.

== Early years ==
Arseneault played college basketball at Colby College, where he graduated with a Bachelor of Arts in Administrative Science in 1976. As a senior in 1975–76 at guard, Arseneault played 22 games and averaged 5.3 points. He then went to Canada and received a Master of Education from Brock University in 1985.

== Coaching career ==
After playing at UPEI in the 1976–77 season and Lakehead University in the 1977–78 season, Arseneault coached college basketball in Canada in Ontario Universities Athletics Association, later known as Ontario University Athletics (OAU), for the Guelph Gryphons and McMaster Marauders. He moved to the United States and coached women's basketball in New Hampshire for two years at the now-defunct Hawthorne College, where he was also their athletic director, before coaching the men's team in rural Iowa for the Grinnell Pioneers beginning in 1989. He inherited a Grinnell program, which competed in Division III, that had not had a winning season in 25 years. After a couple years of trying out traditional eight-player rotations, he felt Grinnell needed to change its basketball philosophy to rejuvenate the team and have more fun. Arseneault developed the Grinnell System. Over 26 years, Grinnell won four conference championships, advanced to the postseason 11 times, and led the nation in scoring at all levels of college basketball in 17 of the past 19 seasons. Areseneault retired in June 2018. He was succeeded by his son, David Jr., who had been serving as the Pioneers' interim head coach.

After Grinnell's Jack Taylor twice scored 100 points in a game, including an NCAA-record 138, Arseneault and his program have been criticized for focusing on records and running up the score on overmatched opponents. Deadspin wrote that Arseneault "has focused less on putting together a successful team and more on getting his players' names in the record books." However, former Grinnell player Ross Preston, author of the book The Road to 138, counters that Arseneault transformed a program that was a combined 52–222 with no championships under its four previous coaches, and the choice to use his system was to improve the program, with the scoring records being only a byproduct.

Under Arseneault, Grinnell has designated select games to pursue a record. Three times an Arseneault-coached player has set the Division III single-game scoring record, each time against an opponent from a lower division. His son and then-Grinnell associate head coach David Jr. said the team allowed one player to score so much since Grinnell was trying to win their conference and lead the nation in scoring, and their "best hope of winning a conference title is our best player playing at a high level." Earlier as a player with Grinnell, David Jr. once set the national record for assists in a game (34) when the team was instructed to shoot only if they received the pass from him. Critics have hinted that Arseneault designed the Grinnell System as a scheme to get national attention and sell books. Preston countered that the system started as a means to turn around a losing program; he added that Arseneault was a member of the Grinnell faculty and expected to share his insights with peers in his field. Critics including Gregg Doyel of CBSSports.com charged that Arseneualt influenced his book sales by having his players' scoring records coincide with the books' release. In August 2013, Arseneault released his second book, titled System Successes; during the 2013–14 season, Taylor scored 109 points and Grinnell guard Patrick Maher set an NCAA record with 37 assists, breaking David Jr.'s previous record. Taylor' big game came against Crossroads College, which played in National Christian College Athletic Association (NCCAA), a level below National Association of Intercollegiate Athletics (NAIA), which was lower than Grinnell's Division III; Maher's record was against College of Faith, a 100-person Christian school with a new sports program and an 0–10 record.

== Head coaching record ==
Record table
Season	Team	Overall	Conference	Standing	Postseason
Grinnell Pioneers (Midwest Conference) (1989–present)
1989–90	Grinnell	3–19	2–12	6th (South)	
1990–91	Grinnell	7–15	3–11	6th (South)	
1991–92	Grinnell	11–11	5–8	T–4th (South)	
1992–93	Grinnell	10–12	5–9	T–4th (South)	
1993–94	Grinnell	13–8	8–6	3rd (South)	
1994–95	Grinnell	14–7	9–5	3rd (South)	
1995–96	Grinnell	17–8	11–3	1st (South)	NCAA D-III First Round
1996–97	Grinnell	11–12	8–6	2nd (South)	
1997–98	Grinnell	10–12	5–8	4th (South)	
1998–99	Grinnell	11–11	7–9	7th	
1999–2000	Grinnell	6–15	4–12		
2000–01	Grinnell	16–8	12–4	1st	NCAA D-III First Round
2001–02	Grinnell	12–12	9–7	T–3rd	
2002–03	Grinnell	19–6	13–3	1st	
2003–04	Grinnell	18–6	11–5	3rd	
2004–05	Grinnell	8–16	5–11	T–7th	
2005–06	Grinnell	14–9	10–8	3rd	
2006–07	Grinnell	17–7	13–3	3rd	
2007–08	Grinnell	16–8	11–5	2nd	
2008–09	Grinnell	18–7	13–3	T–1st	
2009–10	Grinnell	8–15	6–10	T–7th	
2010–11	Grinnell	18–7	12–6	T–2nd	
2011–12	Grinnell	18–5	14–4	2nd	
2012–13	Grinnell	17–6	14–4	2nd	
2013–14	Grinnell	19–6	13–5	2nd	
2014–15	Grinnell	15–10	12–6	T–3rd	
2015–16	Grinnell	9–14	6–12	T–8th	
2016–17	Grinnell	7–2	4–0		
Total:		361–273			
National champion Postseason invitational champion Conference regular season champion Conference regular season and conference tournament champion Division regular season champion Division regular season and conference tournament champion Conference tournament champion

== Publications ==
- Arseneault, David M. (1997). The Running Game. Reedswain. ISBN 978-1-890946-00-5.
