= 1992 Troy State vs. DeVry men's basketball game =

Highest-scoring college basketball game

DeVry at Troy State
Regular season game
DeVry Hoyas	Troy State Trojans
(3–15)	(12–3)
141	258
Head coach: George Trawick	Head coach: Don Maestri
	1st half	2nd half	Total
DeVry Hoyas	53	88	141
Troy State Trojans	123	135	258
- Date: January 12, 1992
- Venue: Sartain Hall, Troy, Alabama
- Referees: Paul Andrewjewski; Mike Murphy; Bill Gauldin
- Attendance: 2,000

The 1992 Troy State vs. DeVry men's basketball game is the highest-scoring men's basketball game in National Collegiate Athletic Association (NCAA) history, regardless of division classification. On January 12, 1992, Troy State University, now known as Troy University, defeated DeVry University of Atlanta 258–141 in a game that is considered to have established several unbreakable records.

== Background ==
During the 1991–92 college basketball season, Troy State was playing its penultimate year as an NCAA Division II school before switching to Division I. They were led by head coach Don Maestri, whose unconventional offense-oriented system led to incredibly high-scoring games. The previous season, Troy State had set the NCAA record for points in a game with 187—also against DeVry University of Atlanta.

During the 1991–92 season, Troy State led Division II by scoring an average of 121 points per game, while giving up 107.8 points per game. They attempted an NCAA-record 1,303 three-pointers and scored 444 of them. Maestri directed his team to attempt to steal the ball every time the opponents touched it, and if they missed the steal, opponents would be allowed to score as long as they did so quickly. His team would relentlessly pursue opponents on the defensive end; on offense, no shot was considered a bad shot, and the quicker the attempt, the better. He substituted players regularly and knew that his track-meet style of pressure would eventually wear out the other team. The high-octane offense was modeled after Paul Westhead's Loyola Marymount teams of the era; Maestri even had Westhead mail him Loyola Marymount game tapes to study the plays and methods used by the successful Division I school.

Heading into the 1992 match-up against DeVry University of Atlanta, the Trojans sported a 12–3 record while the DeVry Hoyas had a 3–15 record. DeVry was classified as a National Association of Intercollegiate Athletics (NAIA) Division II school, and it struggled to defeat comparably talented opponents, let alone successful NCAA Division II schools. The DeVry team had only seven players, and would have little chance to rest and catch their breath during substitutions.

== The game ==
After tip-off, Troy State scored their first basket after 54 seconds. Player Paul Bryan later said, jokingly, "It was a little touch and go there early." Despite their frenetic pace, the Trojans "only" had 15 points after the first three minutes. As the game settled into its soon-to-be record-breaking pace, points came steadily; with 3:14 remaining in the first half, Troy eclipsed the 100-point mark. Guard Tommy Davis said, "When you see one guy hitting, then everybody gets in the act. It becomes contagious." At the end of the first half, the score was 123–53. They made 21 three-pointers in the first 20 minutes, and their 123 points had already broken their own NCAA single-half record from the year before (103), also set against DeVry.

Within the first three minutes of the second half, the Trojans scored 26 points and had already accumulated 149 overall with 17 minutes remaining. It was not until 6:35 into the second half that Troy State scored their first points of the half that were not three-pointers or dunks. With 10 minutes remaining, Chris Greasham's three-pointer gave Troy 189, eclipsing the previous NCAA single-game scoring record of 187. Then, with 7:53 to go, they surpassed the 200-point mark, becoming the first and only team in college basketball history to surpass this threshold. The scoreboard was not built to display 200-plus points, and so when the moment occurred, it did not display the numbers correctly (the scoreboard operator's solution was to start over at zero). During the second half alone, the Trojans scored 135 points, besting their minutes-old record of 123, and their 30 three-pointers in the second stanza was higher than the NCAA all-time full-game record of 25 (set previously by Troy). Their 51 made three-point field goals more than doubled that record, and their 109 three-point attempts record stood for 31 seasons before being broken in December 2022. Tommy Davis remarked that the game "reminded [him] of a street game you play in the summer." Jack Smith credited their home crowd to giving players the extra energy they needed to maintain the record-shattering pace: "It seems almost impossible to hit 200 points in a game. It's a great, great feeling. The crowd played a big part in us getting the record. Their hollering gave us the energy we needed."

For the game, 10 of the 11 Troy State players scored in double figures. Terry McCord, who the following season would be named an NCAA Division II All-American, led the team with 41 points on 16-for-26 shooting. The only player not to score in double figures was Andy Davis, who made the game's first basket and finished 1-for-1. Eight of the 11 Trojans scored at least 20 points, and of those, five scored at least 29.^{[a]} Smith recorded the game's only triple-double, with 29 points, 13 rebounds, and 11 assists. Of the many statistical anomalies to occur in this high-scoring game, one was that only three total free throws were attempted between the teams (Troy's Tim Fayson attempted, and made, all three). DeVry's Clayton Jones had 19 of the Hoyas' 44 turnovers by himself, while DeVry's Dartez Daniel scored a game-high 42 points on 20-for-30 shooting.

== Box score ==
January 12, 1992

DeVry Hoyas 141, Troy State Trojans 258
Scoring by half: 53–123, 88–135
Pts: Daniel 42; Rebs: Daniel 11; Asts: Kylers / Quarles 7	Pts: McCord 41; Rebs: Greasham 15; Asts: Smith 11

Sartain Hall, Troy, Alabama
Attendance: 2,000
Referees: Paul Andrewjewski, Mike Murphy, and Bill Gauldin

Legend
Min	Minutes played	FGM	Field goals made	FGA	Field goals attempted	3PM	Three-point field goals made	3PA	Three-point field goals attempted	FTM	Free throws made	FTA	Free throws attempted
Reb	Rebounds	Ast	Assists	Blk	Blocks	Stl	Steals	TO	Turnovers	PF	Personal fouls	Pts	Points

DeVry Hoyas
Player	Min	FGM	FGA	3PM	3PA	FTM	FTA	Reb	Ast	Blk	Stl	TO	PF	Pts
Tim Young	28	3	9	0	0	0	0	2	1	0	0	2	0	6
Chad Heilig	29	13	24	1	3	0	0	8	3	1	1	3	1	27
Dartez Daniel	25	20	30	2	4	0	0	11	3	0	0	7	1	42
Clayton Jones	40	7	16	2	6	0	0	8	6	0	2	19	2	16
Sean Kylers	30	14	22	0	0	0	0	7	7	0	1	7	1	28
Michael Ramsey	26	7	10	0	0	0	0	2	1	0	2	2	1	14
Eugene Quarles	22	3	10	2	7	0	0	5	7	0	1	4	1	8
Team rebounds								3						
Team totals	200	67	121	7	20	0	0	46	28	1	7	44	6	141

Troy State Trojans
Player	Min	FGM	FGA	3PM	3PA	FTM	FTA	Reb	Ast	Blk	Stl	TO	PF	Pts
Dandrea Evans	19	12	20	5	10	0	0	4	2	0	2	1	0	29
Jack Smith	21	12	24	5	11	0	0	13	11	0	3	0	0	29
Andy Davis	19	1	1	0	0	0	0	12	8	0	6	2	0	2
Tommy Davis	15	9	22	6	16	0	0	8	8	0	1	1	0	24
Terry McCord	25	16	26	9	14	0	0	6	6	1	6	0	0	41
Steve Hunt	11	5	9	5	7	0	0	4	4	0	2	1	0	15
Tim Fayson	18	3	10	3	8	3	3	3	5	0	3	0	0	12
Chris Greasham	22	8	19	4	11	0	0	15	5	0	4	0	0	20^{[a]}
Fred Bryant	16	9	14	2	3	0	0	6	9	1	0	0	0	20
Paul Bryan	19	14	16	1	3	0	0	13	2	0	0	3	0	29
Brian Simpson	15	13	29	11	26	0	0	7	5	0	1	3	1	37
Team rebounds								3						
Team totals	200	102	190	51	109	3	3	94	65	2	28	11	1	258

== Aftermath ==
The January 12, 1992, game between Troy State and DeVry remains the highest-scoring single game in NCAA history. Seven statisticians worked for 57 minutes after the game ended to complete its box score. Among records considered unbreakable are total combined points (399), points by one team in one half (135), and three-pointers made (51) by one team in a single game.^{[b]} That season, Troy State compiled a 23–6 overall record while setting many school records along the way, including single-season scoring average (121.0), field goals made and attempted (1,274 / 2,839), three-pointers made and attempted (444 / 1,303), and steals (460). They also set single-game records for points (258), points in a half (135), field goals made and attempted (102 / 190), rebounds (94), assists (65), and total combined points for two teams in a single game. Troy State lost in the first round of the NCAA Division II Tournament. The Trojans have since transitioned to NCAA Division I, and the school changed its name to the current Troy University in 2005. They have won eight conference championships through the 2025–26 season and have reached the NCAA Division I Tournament four times. DeVry University, meanwhile, dropped its entire athletics program from its Atlanta campus in the 1990s. Its teams were rarely competitive, and the cost to maintain sports outweighed the returns. The basketball team finished the 1991–92 season with a 3–16 record.

=== 2017 video analysis ===
On March 13, 2017, SB Nation's Jon Bois published a video in which he argued that the correct final score of the game should have been Troy State 253, DeVry 141. Relying on a recording of the game, Bois counted all made baskets and arrived at 253 points for Troy State. He identified two potential scorer's errors: a Troy State dunk that went in after the horn had errantly blown that resulted in a return of the ball to Troy State, and an attempted three-point basket that ended with the ball lodged between the backboard and rim and should not have been counted.

== See also ==
- 1916 Cumberland vs. Georgia Tech football game – the highest scoring college football game in history
- Grinnell System – a fast-tempo style of basketball developed by coach Dave Arseneault at Grinnell College in Grinnell, Iowa, similar to the tactics used by Don Maestri at Troy
- Nellie Ball – created by NBA head coach Don Nelson, it is a fast-paced run-and-gun offense relying on smaller, more athletic players who can create mismatches by outrunning their opponents

== Footnotes ==
^{a} The official box score lists Greasham's total points as 29. However, the number of two- and three-point field goals he tallied gives him 20 total points. Twenty points also correctly sums the team's total points to 258.
^{b} In this game, Troy State had also set the record for most three-point attempts with 109. On December 8, 2022, that NCAA record was broken by Division III's Grinnell College when all 111 of their field goal attempts against Emmaus Bible College were three-pointers.
