= Grinnell Pioneers men's basketball =

College basketball team from Grinnell, Iowa, U.S.

- University: Grinnell College
- First season: 1900
- Head coach: David Arseneault Jr. (7th season)
- Location: Grinnell, Iowa
- Arena: Darby Gymnasium (capacity: 1,250)
- Conference: Midwest Conference
- Colors: Black and scarlet

NCAA Division III tournament appearances
- 1962, 1996, 2001, 2025, 2026

Conference tournament champions
- 1996, 2001, 2025, 2026

Conference regular-season champions
- 1941, 1962, 1996, 2001, 2003, 2007, 2009, 2026

Uniforms
Home	Away

The Grinnell Pioneers men's basketball team represents the Grinnell College, located in Grinnell, Iowa, United States, in NCAA Division III basketball competition.

== History ==
=== Missouri Valley Conference ===
Grinnell was a member of the Missouri Valley Intercollegiate Athletic Association from 1919 though 1928 when it split in two. It would ultimately stay in what was renamed the Missouri Valley Conference.

=== 2005–present ===
In February 2005, Grinnell became the first Division III school featured in a regular season basketball game by the ESPN network family in 30 years when it faced off against the Beloit Buccaneers on ESPN2. Grinnell lost 86–85. Grinnell College's basketball team attracted ESPN due to the team's run and gun style of playing basketball, also known as the Grinnell System. Coach Dave Arseneault's "system" incorporates a continual full-court press, a fast-paced offense, an emphasis on offensive rebounding, a barrage of three-point shots and substitutions of five players at a time every 35 to 40 seconds. This allows a higher average playing time for more players than the "starters" and suits the Division III goals of scholar-athletes. "The System" has been criticized for not teaching the principles of defense. However, under "The System," Grinnell has won three conference championships over the past ten years and have regularly placed in the top half of the conference. Arseneault's teams have set numerous NCAA scoring records and several individuals on the Grinnell team have led the nation in scoring or assists.

On November 19, 2011, Grinnell player Griffin Lentsch set a Division III individual scoring record in a game against Principia College. The 6-foot-4-inch (1.93 m) guard scored 89 points, besting the previous record of 77, also set by Pioneers player Jeff Clement in 1998. Lentsch made 27 of his 55 shots, including 15 three-pointers as Grinnell won the high-scoring game 145 to 97.

On November 20, 2012, Grinnell's Jack Taylor broke Lentsch's scoring record—as well as the records for NCAA and collegiate scoring—in a 179–104 victory over Faith Baptist Bible. Taylor scored 138 points, besting the previous NCAA record of 113. Taylor scored 109 points in a November 2013 game against Crossroads College to become the first player in NCAA history to have two 100-point games.

In December 2022, Grinnell set an NCAA record (in all divisions) for taking the most three-point shots at 111 attempts. Every attempted field goal was from beyond the three-point arc and Grinnell beat Emmaus Bible College, 124 to 67.

That was also the last time the team qualified for the NCAA Division III Tournament, where it lost by 41 in its first-round matchup.

== Seasons ==
Record table
Season	Coach	Overall	Conference	Standing	Postseason
Grinnell (Independent) (1906–1918)
1900–01		4–3			
1901–02		2–2			
1902–03		7–5			
1903–04		7–4			
1904–05		8–3			
1905–06		8–4			
1906–07		9–2			
1907–08		14–3			
1908–09		12–1			
1909–10		12–1			
1910–11		13–1			
1911–12		9–4			
1912–13		11–0			
1913–14		10–1			
1914–15		10–4			
1915–16		6–6			
1916–17		9–4			
1917–18		7–4			
Grinnell (Missouri Valley Conference) (1918–1939)
1918–19		6–5	5–3	4th	
1919–20		4–10	1–9	8th	
Total:		?-?	?-?		
National champion Postseason invitational champion Conference regular season champion Conference regular season and conference tournament champion Division regular season champion Division regular season and conference tournament champion Conference tournament champion
