= Danny Heater =

American basketball player (born 1942)

Personal information
- Born: February 27, 1942 (age 84) West Virginia, U.S.
- Listed height: 6 ft 0 in (1.83 m)

Career information
- High school: Burnsville (Braxton County, West Virginia)
- Position: Forward

Career highlights
- High school single game scoring record (135 points)

Danny Heater (born February 27, 1942) is an American record holder for the highest single game scoring performance by one player in high school basketball history worldwide.

On January 26, 1960, Heater, a then 17-year-old senior at Burnsville High School in Braxton County, West Virginia scored 135 points against Widen High School of Clay County. In the 32-minute game, Heater made 53 of 70 field goal attempts and 29 of 41 free throws. While Heater is best remembered for the controversial scoring exploit, he also grabbed 32 rebounds and dished out 7 assists in the game.

Heater was encouraged before the historic game, by teammates and coach alike, to try to break the state of West Virginia all-time record of 74 points. By halftime, Heater had scored 50 points, and capped off his 85-point second half with his final 55 points in the last 10 minutes alone. The record is certified by National Federation of State High School Associations and is the highest total ever on a high school or professional level in the United States. It is 35 more points than Wilt Chamberlain's NBA record of 100, but three fewer points than Jack Taylor's 138 of NCAA Division III Grinnell College.

He briefly attended the University of Richmond before returning home to support his family. Heater later worked as a messenger for the Federal Bureau of Investigation and as an airline receptionist.

Now retired, he lives in the Eastern Panhandle of West Virginia with his wife Carol.

== See also ==
- List of basketball players who have scored 100 points in a single game
