= Mohammad Akkari =

Lebanese basketball player

Mohammad Akkari (Arabic: محمد عكاري; born 4 December 1985 in Tripoli) is a former Lebanese basketball player who played for the Lebanese Basketball League's top division basketball club Al Mouttahed Tripoli.

Akkari joined the "basketball 100-point-game club" by scoring 113 points for first division Moutahed's game on April 3, 2012, against Bejjeh basketball team. Akkari, a guard, averages 7.6 points in 23 games, but had the game of his life against Bejjeh by making 40-of-69 shots, including 32-of-59 3-pointers. This was the first 100-point performance in an official game in any league of the FIBA Asia National Federations. The game finished 173–141 in favor of Al Mouttahed.

== See also ==
- List of basketball players who have scored 100 points in a single game
