= Sartain Hall =

Arena in Troy, Alabama

- "The Concrete Box"
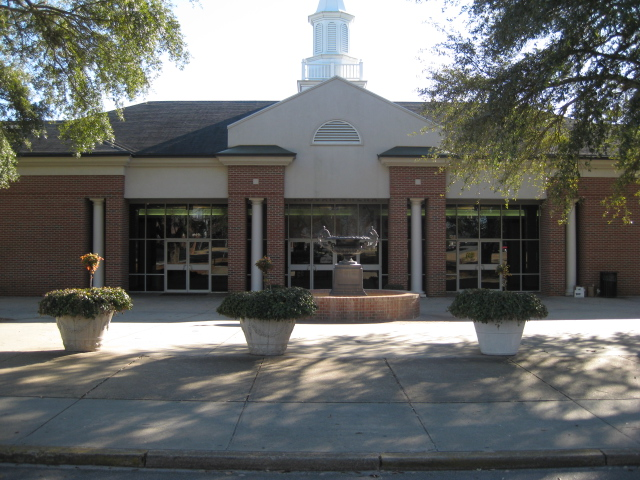
- Interactive map of Sartain Hall
- Former names: Trojan Arena (1999–2010)
- Location: Troy, Alabama
- Coordinates: 31.798899°N 85.953362°W
- Owner: Troy University
- Operator: Troy University
- Capacity: 4,000
- Surface: Hardwood

Construction
- Groundbreaking: 1961
- Opened: 1962
- Closed: 2018
- Demolished: 2018
- Cost: $447,000

Tenant
- Troy Trojans (NCAA) (1962–2012)

Sartain Hall was a 4,000-seat multi-purpose arena in Troy, Alabama. It was home to the Troy University Trojans basketball team until Trojan Arena opened in 2012. It opened in 1962.

The building was built as a new Physical Education Building in 1962, with its major facility being a 2,500-seat basketball gymnasium which was ready for the first basketball game that fall.

Before Sartain Hall, the university never previously had an adequate gymnasium, and the college administration had the foresight at the time to make it available for high school basketball tournaments as well as college games and tournaments. The building was named in honor of the late Professor Auxford Sartain (1894–1960).

In 1999, the building was renamed Trojan Arena, but went back to its original name in Summer 2010 when the new Trojan Arena underwent construction.

The building hosted many different events, from college basketball games to high school basketball games to graduations to rock music concerts to the Harlem Globetrotters. Over its time, the building became a staple of history in the lore of Troy University athletics.

In July 2018, Troy University invited current and former Troy students, faculty and staff, as well as the public, to visit the Sartain Hall facility one last time before demolition began on August 13, 2018, to make way for a new Trojan Fitness Center, now under construction.

== Notable events ==
Sartain Hall was home to the highest scoring college basketball game in NCAA history in 1992, where Troy University (then known as Troy State) defeated DeVry University of Atlanta for a combined total of 399 points. Troy won the game 258–141.
