= Jack Taylor (basketball) =

American basketball player (born 1990)

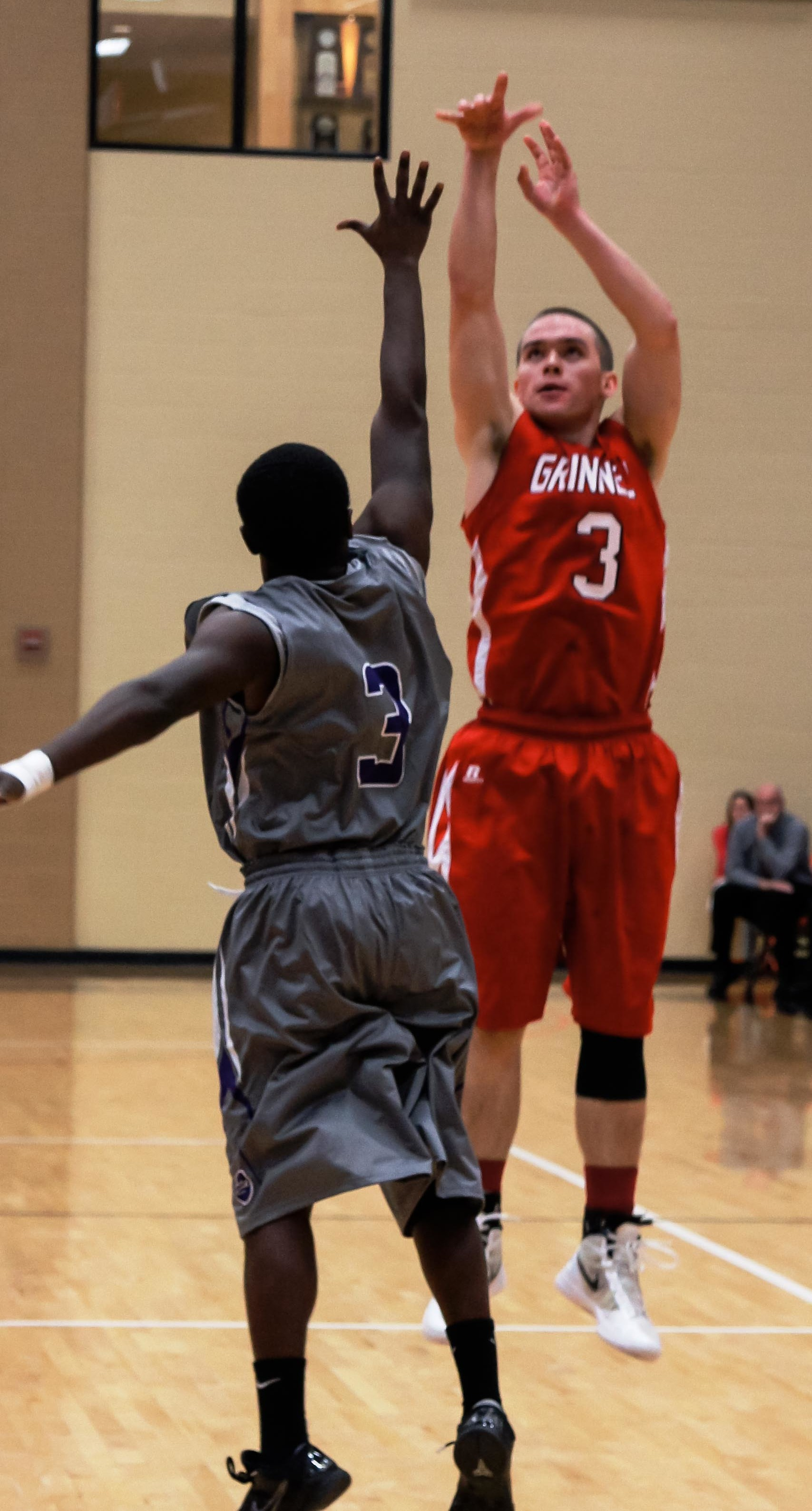
- Taylor (right) shooting with the Grinnell Pioneers in 2012

Personal information
- Born: October 12, 1990 (age 36) Lakeside, California, U.S.
- Listed height: 5 ft 10 in (1.78 m)
- Listed weight: 165 lb (75 kg)

Career information
- High school: Black River Falls (Black River Falls, Wisconsin); Mercersburg Academy (Mercersburg, Pennsylvania)
- College: Wisconsin–La Crosse (2011–2012); Grinnell (2012–2015)
- NBA draft: 2015: undrafted
- Position: Guard
- Coaching career: 2024–present

Career history

Coaching
- 2024–present: Black River Falls HS

Career highlights
- As player: First-team All-Midwest Conference (2015); Second-team All-Midwest Conference (2014); NCAA record for most points in a game (138)

Jack Taylor (born October 12, 1990) is an American former college basketball player at Grinnell College. He holds the National Collegiate Athletic Association (NCAA) record for most points in a single game after scoring 138 in 2012. He also scored the NCAA's third-highest total of 109 in 2013.

Taylor played four years of basketball at Black River Falls High School in Wisconsin, where he was an All-State player and was the second-leading scorer in the school's history. He then attended boarding school at Mercersburg Academy in Pennsylvania, where he suffered a major knee injury. After recovering, he played one season at the University of Wisconsin–La Crosse. He transferred to Grinnell to play in their high-scoring system. After his record-setting performance, his 2012–13 season ended prematurely after he broke his arm. He recovered to become a two-time All-Midwest Region selection over the next two seasons.

== Early life ==
Taylor was born in Lakeside, California. His favorite player growing up was National Basketball Association (NBA) star Kobe Bryant; Taylor emulated Bryant's footwork while using chairs to act as defenders. His aunt, Pixar film producer Darla K. Anderson, often paid for him to attend basketball camps at upper-tier colleges like Duke and Stanford, where he faced tough competition.

Taylor attended Black River Falls High School in Black River Falls, Wisconsin and lettered in basketball for four years. In his senior year in 2008–09, he averaged 20.4 points and 4.7 assists per game and shot 42.3 percent on three-point field goals. He was Coulee Conference Player of the Year, first-team All-Conference, WBCA Division 2 first-team All-State, and AP honorable mention all-state. He finished his career as the second-leading scorer in school history with 1,295 points, averaging 20.7 points per game. He received interest from NCAA Division I Columbia, Division II Augustana, and Division III Grinnell.

Unable to secure a Division I athletic scholarship, he attended Mercersburg Academy in Pennsylvania as a postgraduate after graduating from high school. Mercersburg, a boarding school that offered college-level courses, played in a league that produced Division I players. Taylor was averaging around 14 points and seven assists in nine games at Mercersburg before tearing the anterior cruciate ligament (ACL) and lateral meniscus in his left knee in January 2010. He missed the remainder of the season after undergoing surgery. In April, he committed to playing at the Division III University of Wisconsin–La Crosse, again turning down Grinnell.

== College career ==
Taylor sat out his first season at UW–La Crosse as he recovered from his knee injury. In his freshman season in 2011–12, he averaged 7.0 points in 13.4 minutes in 27 games as a reserve. He made 39.4 percent of his three-pointers. However, Taylor stopped enjoying basketball, and he loathed practice. After one season at UW–La Crosse, Taylor transferred to Division III Grinnell. The school employed a unique offensive style—known as the Grinnell System—that relied on shooting as many three-pointers as possible; Taylor thought it fit his playing style. Grinnell had led all levels of NCAA in scoring for 17 of the past 19 seasons, and their 126.2 points per game in 2003–04 ranked second in history.

In his first season at Grinnell, the team won their first two games with Taylor leading the team in scoring averaging 23.5 points in 13.5 minutes; however, he was only shooting 17.6 percent on three-pointers (6 of 34) and 26.8 percent overall (11 of 41). Although Grinnell players rarely played more than 20 minutes a game, Grinnell coach David Arseneault Jr. intended to give him extended playing time the following game to have him work out of his slump before the start of their conference schedule. On November 20, 2012, in a 179–104 win over National Christian College Athletic Association-member Faith Baptist Bible College, Taylor scored 138 points, setting the NCAA record for most points by an individual player in a game. He played 36 minutes and shot 52-of-108 from the field, 27-of-71 from three-point range, and 7 of 10 from the free throw line. The 108 attempts were an average of three shots per minute. Taylor scored 58 points in the first half and 80 in the second; he was only 9 of 32 three-pointers in the first half before making 18 of 39 three-pointers in the second half, including seven consecutive in 1 minute 57 seconds. During one stretch, he scored a Division III-record 28 consecutive points. He also set NCAA single-game records for most three-point field goals, three-point field goals attempted, field goals, and field goals attempted. His 80 points in a half were also a record.

Arseneault said the team "left open the possibility [for Taylor setting a record] if he got to off to a great start." Occasionally, Grinnell designated a game for pursuing a record. At halftime, Taylor thought he only had 30 points, not the actual 58. His previous career high was 48, set in high school. He reached 91 points on a 25-footer from the left wing with 11:14 remaining, breaking the Division III record set by Grinnell teammate Griffin Lentsch in the previous season. (Note: Lentch scored 89 against Principia College on November 19, 2011. He broke the Division III record of another Grinnell player, Jeff Clement, who scored 77 in 1998.) Less than three minutes later, he scored 100 on a layup. With 4:42 left in the game, he hit a three-pointer to pass the NCAA record of 113 set by Bevo Francis of Division II Rio Grande College in 1954. (Note: Francis scored 113 in a 134–91 win over Hillsdale College. Rio Grande College later became a National Association of Intercollegiate Athletics (NAIA) school.) Taylor did not leave the game until the closing moments with Grinnell up by 70. Arseneault considered taking him out earlier, but he did not feel right taking out Taylor after his consecutive three-pointer streak. Taylor was the third player to score one hundred or more points in an NCAA game, joining Francis and Frank Selvy. He was also the first college or pro player to surpass the high school record of 135 set by Danny Heater in 1960.

National Basketball Association (NBA) players, including Bryant and LeBron James, expressed amazement at Taylor's 138 points. Players mentioned him on Twitter, and his name was a trending topic. Highlights of Taylor were shown on almost every major channel, and newspapers nationwide covered the story. He talked to ESPN, and appeared as a guest the following day on Good Morning America, The Today Show, and Jimmy Kimmel Live!. Grinnell received over 300 e-mail requests for interviews with Taylor, including one from Australia. Pizza Hut sold pizzas at $1.38 to commemorate the record.

In his following game against William Penn, ESPN and The Boston Globe were among at least five different media outlets covering Taylor's follow-up performance. He scored 21 points on 6-for-21 shooting in a 131–116 loss. He was later named the Midwest Conference Performer of the Week. Taylor's 2012–13 season ended prematurely on January 9, 2013 when he broke the radius of his shooting arm during a 119–117 win over rival Cornell. This injury cost him the rest of the season. At the time of his injury, he was averaging 36.3 points.

Taylor returned for the 2013–14 season healthy and with aspirations of leading the nation in scoring. Arseneault stated that Taylor "has earned the right to have the ball in his hands even more than last year." On November 15, 2013, in Grinnell's season-opening game, Taylor scored 71 points on 23-of-52 shooting in a 144–99 win against Finlandia University. The following game against Crossroads College, he surpassed the 100-point mark again with 109, including 53 in the first nine minutes of the second half of the 173–123 win. Overall, he played 29 minutes while shooting 35 of 70 from the field, 24 for 48 on three-pointers, and making 15 of 17 free throws. He exited the game with 5:32 remaining holding the third-highest single-game point total in NCAA history, behind his own NCAA record and Francis's 113. He was the first college player to twice score over 100 against a four-year college. In his next game, which was also the one-year anniversary of his record 138-point game, Taylor was double- and sometimes triple-teamed by Wartburg College and scored just three points in 19 minutes in an 88–79 win. He finished the season as the nation's leader in points per game (28.8) and three-pointers per game (5.38). He was named to the All-Midwest Conference Second Team, and D3hoops.com named him to their All-Midwest Region Third Team.

In Taylor's senior year, he scored 52 points in a 118–109 loss to Beloit College on November 22, 2014. He again led the nation in scoring (28.4) and three-pointers (5.04), and was second in free throws made (185). He was a first-team All-Midwest Conference selection, was voted to the All-Central Region Second Team.

== Professional career ==
After graduating from Grinnell, Taylor signed with the Scorers 1st Sportsmanagement agency. He went undrafted in the 2015 NBA draft. In July 2015, he was one of 60 players accepted to participate in the agency's two-day showcase in Las Vegas that was attended by international scouts, mostly from European leagues. According to Taylor, he realized that he "could play at a lower level professionally. Not play in front of packed gyms and probably not have big contracts". However, he decided to move on from basketball. By 2016, he stated that he was no longer interested in either playing or watching basketball.

== NCAA records ==
- Most points, game (138)
- Most points, half (80)
- Most field goals, game (52)
- Most field goals attempted, game (108)
- Most three-point field goals, game (27)
- Most three-point field goals attempted, game (71)

== Personal life ==
Taylor became engaged to high school sweetheart Christina Teeples in August 2013, and the two married in the summer of 2014. Teeples also played basketball at Black River Falls High. They had a daughter, Abigail, in 2016.

Taylor became a videographer, and founded his company Taylor Media in Black River Falls. He also began a podcast with some of the town's residents, and became a co-host of the television program Discover Wisconsin. As of 2022, he had over 15,000 subscribers on his YouTube channel, which features clips about life in Black River Falls. In 2024, he became the boys basketball head coach at his alma mater Black River Falls High.

== See also ==
- List of basketball players who have scored 100 points in a single game
