= International League (California) =

High school athletic conference

The International League is a high school athletic conference in Los Angeles County, California affiliated with the CIF Southern Section.

== Schools ==
As of 2018, the schools in the league are:

- Calvary Baptist School
- Lycée Français de Los Angeles
- Armenian Mesrobian School
- New Harvest Christian School
- St. Monica Academy
- The Waverly School
- Yeshiva High Tech
- International School of Los Angeles
- New Covenant Academy
