= Anat Draigor =

Israeli basketball player

Anat Draigor ענת דרייגור
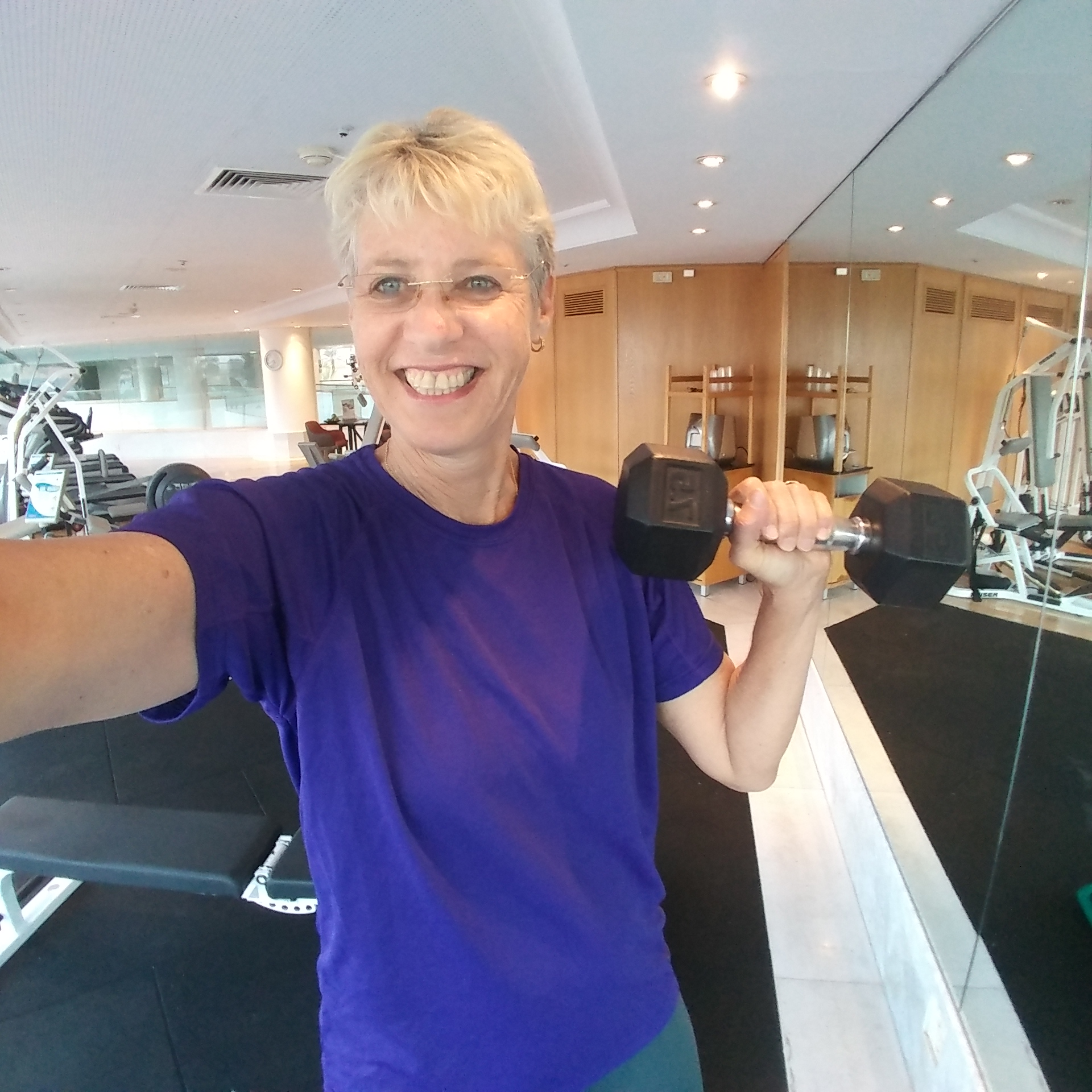

Personal information
- Born: March 22, 1960 (age 66) Beer-Sheva, Israel
- Listed height: 6 ft 1 in (1.85 m)

Career information
- Playing career: 1975–2015
- Position: Center 4-5

Career highlights
- Guinness world record for the number of points scored in a single game by a female

Anat Draigor (Hebrew: ענת דרייגור; born 22 March 1960 in Beersheba, Israel) is a former professional basketball player who in 2006 set the Guinness world record for the most points scored in a single game by a female. On April 6, 2006, the 46-year-old Draigor of Israel set that record by scoring 136 points in a single game. The record occurred during a game between Draigor's Mate Yehuda and Elitzur Givat Shmuel in the third basketball league. The game's overall score was 158–41.

== Career ==
Draigor started to play basketball when she was 14 years old. She played professionally from the 1985–86 season until 1993–94. She played most of her career in Israel, for Elitzur Holon, and played in France in 2 occasions: in 1980–81, in Clermont-Ferrand (where she took the French championship); and in 1991–92 in Racing club de Paris.

Until the early nineties, the female Israeli basketball primary league was closed to foreign players; and when the league officials allowed foreign players to participate, it was Draigor's big challenge to test her abilities against American and Eastern Europe professionals. Draigor remained one of the leading scorers and rebounders in the league until her retirement.

In the European championship in the summer of 1991, Draigor scored 31 against Czechoslovakia, leading Israel to an historical win. This performance was "caught" by representatives of French club Racing Paris, and at the age of 31, Draigor was the first Israeli player – male or female – to be signed to a contract to play overseas professionally.

After her retirement, Draigor went on to coaching. Her career as a coach included several Israeli female teams in the major league, and u-16 national team.

== See also ==
- List of basketball players who have scored 100 points in a single game
