= Stockton Kings =

American professional basketball team of the NBA G League

- Conference: Western
- League: NBA G League
- Founded: 2008
- History: Reno Bighorns; 2008–2018; Stockton Kings; 2018–present
- Arena: Adventist Health Arena
- Location: Stockton, California
- Team colors: Black, purple, gray, white
- General manager: Gabriel Harris
- Head coach: Will Scott
- Ownership: Sacramento Kings (represented by Vivek Ranadivé, Paul E. Jacobs, and Raj Bhathal)
- Affiliation: Sacramento Kings
- Championships: 1 (2025)
- Conference titles: 2 (2025, 2026)
- Division titles: 3 (2011, 2016, 2018)
- Website: stockton.gleague.nba.com

The Stockton Kings are an American professional basketball team in the NBA G League based in Stockton, California. They are affiliated with the Sacramento Kings, and play their home games at the Adventist Health Arena.

The team began play during the 2008–09 season in Reno, Nevada, as the Reno Bighorns. They moved to Stockton and changed their name in 2018.

== History ==
=== Reno Bighorns ===
Logo for the Reno Bighorns during their last season.

The Reno Bighorns began play in the 2008–09 season with their home games at the Reno Events Center. Their namesake was the desert bighorn sheep, which is the state animal of Nevada. The Bighorns were primarily affiliated with the Sacramento Kings, which has been with the team since its inception in 2008. Reno also had affiliations with the New York Knicks (2008–2009), Orlando Magic (2009–2010), Golden State Warriors (2010–2011), Atlanta Hawks (2011–2012), Memphis Grizzlies (2011–2013), and the Utah Jazz (2012–2013).

During the 2014–15 season the Bighorns led the NBA D-League in scoring and also in call-ups to the NBA with seven. The performance of the team and players like Brady Heslip, Tajuan Porter, and Sim Bhullar garnered media attention in not only the Reno area but also on a national scale with national outlets like The Dan Patrick Show and CBS' The Late Late Show putting a spotlight on the team. Head coach David Arseneault Jr. and his offense, called "The System" were profiled by The Guardian in late February 2015 in an article that put a spotlight on the coach's innovative game plan that he helped to develop with his father at Grinnell College.

On October 20, 2016, the Bighorns were purchased by their parent club, the Sacramento Kings, after being affiliated with the team since its inaugural season. With the purchase, the Bighorns became the fifteenth D-League team to become directly owned by a parent club. The team slightly changed its logo the following season, changing the color scheme to match that of their parent team and adding a crown over the I to match it as well. The team moved after the 2017–18 season.

=== Stockton Kings ===
On April 9, 2018, the Sacramento Kings revealed that they planned to move the club to Stockton, California, to play in the Stockton Arena pending league approval. On April 17, the lease for the use of the arena was approved and the new team name was revealed as the Stockton Kings. The Kings announced their first head coach in Stockton as former Northern Arizona Suns' head coach, Tyrone Ellis on August 13.

Ellis led the team to postseason appearance following the 2018–19 season, but the following season was curtailed by the onset of the COVID-19 pandemic while the Kings were in first place in the Pacific Division. Ellis then left the team in 2020 and the Sacramento Kings chose to not have their affiliate participate in the abbreviated single-site 2020–21 NBA G League season. On May 27, 2021, the Sacramento Kings appointed their assistant and player development coach, Bobby Jackson, as the next head coach of the Stockton team.

== Season-by-season results ==
| Season | Division | Regular season | | | | Playoffs |
| Season | Division | Finish | Wins | Losses | Pct. | Playoffs |
|---|---|---|---|---|---|---|
Reno Bighorns
| 2008–09 | Western | 4th | 25 | 25 | .500 | |
| 2009–10 | Western | 3rd | 28 | 22 | .560 | Lost First Round (Rio Grande Valley) 1–2 |
| 2010–11 | Western | 1st | 34 | 16 | .680 | Won First Round (Erie) 2–1; Lost Semifinals (Rio Grande Valley) 1–2 |
| 2011–12 | Western | 7th | 21 | 29 | .420 | |
| 2012–13 | Western | 5th | 16 | 34 | .320 | |
| 2013–14 | Western | 3rd | 27 | 23 | .540 | Lost First Round (Fort Wayne) 0–2 |
| 2014–15 | Western | 3rd | 20 | 30 | .400 | |
| 2015–16 | Pacific | 1st | 33 | 17 | .660 | Lost First Round (Los Angeles) 1–2 |
| 2016–17 | Pacific | 4th | 21 | 29 | .420 | |
Reno Bighorns
| 2017–18 | Pacific | 1st | 29 | 21 | .580 | Lost Conf. Semifinal (South Bay) 109–126 |
Stockton Kings
| 2018–19 | Pacific | 2nd | 30 | 20 | .600 | Lost First Round (Memphis) 119–122 |
| 2019–20 | Pacific | 1st | 24 | 19 | .558 | Season cancelled by COVID-19 pandemic |
| 2020–21 | Opted out of single-site season | | | | | |
| 2021–22 | Western | 8th | 15 | 18 | .455 | |
| 2022–23 | Western | 1st | 25 | 7 | .781 | Lost Semifinals (Sioux Falls) 97–98 |
| 2023–24 | Western | 1st | 24 | 10 | .706 | Won Semifinals (Santa Cruz) 112–109; Lost Conference Finals (Oklahoma City) 107–114 |
| 2024–25 | Western | 1st | 22 | 12 | .647 | Won Semifinals (Valley) 122–114; Won Conference Finals (Austin) 118–112; Won Championship (Osceola) 2–1 |
| 2025–26 | Western | 3rd | 23 | 13 | .639 | Won Quarterfinals (Iowa) 116-104; Won Semifinals (Rip City 107-95; Won Conference Finals (South Bay) 118–112; Lost Championship (Greensboro) 0–2 |
| Regular season | | | 417 | 345 | .547 | |
| Playoffs | | | 11 | 15 | .423 | |

== Current roster ==
Stockton Kings roster
Players

| Pos. | No. | Player | Height | Weight | DOB | From |
|---|---|---|---|---|---|---|
| G | 0 | Antoine Davis | 6 ft 1 in (1.85 m) | 165 lb (75 kg) | 1998-10-03 | Detroit Mercy |
| G | 55 | Sean East II | 6 ft 3 in (1.91 m) | 180 lb (82 kg) | 1999-11-17 | Missouri |
| G | – | Adam Flagler (TW) | 6 ft 1 in (1.85 m) | 180 lb (82 kg) | 1999-12-01 | Baylor |
| G/F | 1 | KJ Jones II | 6 ft 6 in (1.98 m) | 190 lb (86 kg) | 2001-03-31 | Emmanuel University |
| G | 22 | Mitchell Mascari | 6 ft 5 in (1.96 m) | 200 lb (91 kg) | 2000-08-21 | Drake |
| F | – | Jonathan Mogbo (TW) | 6 ft 9 in (2.06 m) | 225 lb (102 kg) | 2001-10-29 | San Francisco |

Coaches
Head coach
- Will Scott
Assistant(s)
- Dru Anthrop
- Sidney Dobner
- Dane Johnson

Legend
- (DP) Unsigned draft pick
- (FA) Free agent
- (S) Suspended
- (P) Prospects
- (NBA) On assignment from NBA affiliate
- (TW) Two-way affiliate player
- Injured

Roster
Updated: March 3, 2026

== Head coaches ==
| # | Head coach | Term | Regular season | | | | Playoffs | | | | Achievements |
| # | Head coach | Term | G | W | L | Win% | G | W | L | Win% | Achievements |
|---|---|---|---|---|---|---|---|---|---|---|---|
| 1 | Jay Humphries | 2008–10 | 100 | 53 | 47 | .530 | 3 | 1 | 2 | .333 | |
| 2 | Eric Musselman | 2010–11 | 50 | 34 | 16 | .680 | 6 | 3 | 3 | .500 | |
| 3 | Paul Mokeski | 2011–12 | 50 | 21 | 29 | .420 | — | — | — | — | |
| 4 | Jason Glover | 2012–13 | 50 | 16 | 34 | .320 | — | — | — | — | |
| 5 | Joel Abelson | 2013–14 | 50 | 27 | 23 | .540 | 2 | 0 | 2 | .000 | |
| 6 | David Arseneault Jr. | 2014–16 | 100 | 53 | 47 | .530 | 3 | 1 | 2 | .333 | |
| 7 | Darrick Martin | 2016–18 | 100 | 50 | 50 | .500 | 1 | 0 | 1 | .000 | |
| 8 | Tyrone Ellis | 2018–2020 | 93 | 54 | 39 | .581 | 1 | 0 | 1 | .000 | |
| 9 | Bobby Jackson | 2021–2023 | 65 | 40 | 25 | .615 | 1 | 0 | 1 | .000 | |
| 10 | Lindsey Harding | 2023–2024 | 34 | 24 | 10 | .706 | 2 | 1 | 1 | .500 | |
| 11 | Quinton Crawford | 2024–2025 | 34 | 22 | 12 | .647 | - | - | - | – | |
| 12 | Will Scott | 2025– | 36 | 23 | 13 | .639 | 5 | 3 | 2 | .600 | |

== NBA affiliates ==
=== Reno Bighorns ===
- Atlanta Hawks (2011–2012)
- Golden State Warriors (2010–2011)
- Memphis Grizzlies (2011–2013)
- New York Knicks (2008–2009)
- Orlando Magic (2009–2010)
- Sacramento Kings (2008–2018)
- Utah Jazz (2012–2013)

=== Stockton Kings ===
- Sacramento Kings (2018–present)
