= Dyckman Basketball Tournament =

Summer streetball tournament

The Dyckman Basketball Tournament is one of the premier summer streetball tournaments in New York City. It is located in Monsignor Kett Playground a.k.a. Dyckman Park in the Washington Heights/Inwood section of Manhattan. What was a one division, six-team tournament in its first season in 1990 is currently a tournament with six age divisions, containing a total of 77 teams. Its college/pro division is the most notable of them all, on any given night you are likely to see NBA, NCAA, and overseas professionals on the court.

== History ==
The tournament was formed by Kenneth Stevens, Omar Booth, and Michael Jenkins in an effort to provide a positive outlet for the community. Inwood, like many other neighborhoods in inner cities during the late 1980s was plagued by the crack epidemic. The community was infested with drugs, crime and interracial turf wars between the emerging Dominican population and the existing black population in the area.

During this time Monsignor Kett Playground was in horrible conditions and free of basketball and any related activities. The park that was once known for being a Holcombe Rucker site during the 1970s was now an eyesore for the community and area residents. Stevens, Booth, and Jenkins painted the court and restored the park to conditions apt to host a tournament. The three believed creating a basketball tournament would spark positive relations through sport, community and goodwill, thus changing the culture in the community and furthering the effort to better the community. In its first season the tournament hosted a six-team, twelve-man roster playing in a five-game regular season leading to the playoffs.

The tournament continued to progress every year with help from local businesses who sponsored the tournament. On its tenth anniversary it landed its first corporate sponsor in Converse (shoe company). From there on they have received sponsorships from numerous corporate companies in addition to their local supporters. Their biggest sponsors have been Nike, Inc., who has been affiliated since 2004. In 2011 Nike formed a team in the tournament with the top street ballers in NYC and named them “Team Nike.” Coached by the legendary Maxwell "Bingo" Cole, they won the championship.

== Divisions ==
- College-Pro Division: 19 Teams
- High School Division: 16 Teams
- Junior Division: 16 Teams
- Biddy Division: 14 Teams
- Pee Wee Division: 6 Teams
- Super Pee Wee Division: 6 Teams

== Regular season/playoffs (College/Pro Division) ==
- 7 regular season games
- 2 Conferences
- Teams are seeded 1-8 on both sides
- Playoffs are one game elimination

== Past champions (College/Pro Division) ==
- 1990 - Dyckman
- 1991 - Dyckman
- 1992 - Dyckman
- 1993 - Head Bangers
- 1994 - Regulators
- 1995 - Head Bangers
- 1996 - Big Tyme
- 1997 – N/A
- 1998 –N/A
- 1999 - Da Fundamentalz
- 2000 -The Wall
- 2001 - The Wall
- 2002 - Team and 1
- 2003 - Takes No Prisoners
- 2004 - Takes No Prisoners
- 2005 - 84th St.
- 2006 - Takes No Prisoners
- 2007 - Dominican Power
- 2008 - Bingo's All-Stars
- 2009 - Bingo's All-Stars
- 2010 - Takes No Prisoners
- 2011 - Team Nike
- 2012 – Team 914
- 2013 - BodySnatchers
- 2018 - TMT/Showstoppers

== Notable players ==
- Rick Apodaca
- Ron Artest
- Sean Banks
- Michael Beasley
- Corey Brewer
- Trey Burker
- Keydren Clark
- Baron Davis
- Adris De León
- DeMar DeRozan
- Markelle Fultz
- Kevin Durant
- Jerome Dyson
- Gary Ervin
- Tyreke Evans
- Corey Fisher
- Luis Flores
- Gary Forbes
- Sundiata Gaines
- Francisco García
- Ricardo Greer
- Dwight Hardy
- Jeremy Hazell
- JJ Hickson
- Brandon Jennings
- Felipe López
- Anthony Morrow
- Allan Ray
- Kareem Reid
- Terry Rozier
- Kenny Satterfield
- Iman Shumpert
- Chris Smith
- J. R. Smith
- Edgar Sosa
- Curtis Stinson
- Curtis Sumpter
- Tyshawn Taylor
- Charlie Villanueva
- Kemba Walker
- Corey Williams
- Curtis Dennis
- Jarrid Famous
- Kyrie Irving
