= Run and gun (basketball) =

Fast, freewheeling style of basketball play

In basketball, run and gun is a fast, freewheeling style of play that features a high number of field goal attempts, resulting in high-scoring games. The offense typically relies on fast breaks while placing less emphasis on set plays. A run-and-gun team typically allows many points on defense as well.

In the National Basketball Association (NBA), the run and gun was at its peak in the 1960s when teams scored an average of 115 points a game. Around 2003, the average had dropped to 95. The Boston Celtics were a run-and-gun team in the 1950s and 1960s while winning 11 NBA championships, as were the five-time champion Los Angeles Lakers during their Showtime era in the 1980s. Although the run and gun is believed by many to de-emphasize defense, the Celtics of the '60s had Bill Russell and the Lakers of the '80s had Kareem Abdul-Jabbar as defensive stoppers.

Coach Doug Moe, who ran the run and gun with the Denver Nuggets in the 1980s, believed the high scores surrendered were more indicative of the fast pace of the game than a low level of defense. Still, his teams sometimes appeared to give up baskets in order to score one. Though his offensive strategy led to high scores, Moe's Denver teams were never adept at running fast breaks.

== Paul Westhead ==
Paul Westhead coached the Loyola Marymount men's team in the late 1980s using a version of the run and gun. While run and gun basketball is often thought of as a system of offense, Westhead's system uses a combined offensive and defensive philosophy. Offensively, the team moves the ball forward as quickly as possible and takes the first available shot, often a three-pointer. Westhead's teams try to shoot the ball in less than seven seconds. The aim is to shoot before the defense is able to get set. Defensively, the team applies constant full-court pressure. Generally, the team is willing to gamble on giving away easy baskets for the sake of maintaining a high tempo.

Loyola Marymount successfully used the system in 1990 when they advanced to the Elite 8 of the NCAA basketball tournament, beating the defending champion Michigan 149–115 along the way. The style has been used at some other teams.

In 1990, Westhead was hired by the Denver Nuggets and tried to integrate the LMU system on the team. However, the differences between college and the NBA game became apparent from the beginning. Whereas the LMU system worked on a 40-minute game during a 30–40 game NCAA season, it did not translate to a 48-minute game during an 82-game NBA season.

The Nuggets averaged a league-best 119.9 points per game in 1990-91, but also surrendered an NBA record 130.8 points per game. They also allowed 107 points to be scored in a single half to the Phoenix Suns, which also remains an NBA record. Under Westhead, the Nuggets were sometimes called the "Enver Nuggets" (as in no "D," or no defense). After the season, Westhead generally abandoned his LMU system and played at a slower pace in hopes of conserving his players' energy during a long season. However, the 1991-92 Nuggets only improved to 24 wins, largely because they continued to give up points so quickly that even their prolific offense couldn't keep up. Westhead was fired after posting a combined two-year record of 44–120.

Westhead's system has been imitated by other college teams, including Grinnell College. David Arseneault, the architect of the Grinnell System, added to Westhead's system by substituting players in three waves of five players, similar to an ice hockey shift. The highest scoring game in NCAA history was played by two teams (Troy and DeVry-Atlanta) who both employed Westhead's system the entire game, resulting in 399 combined points in 1992.
