= The Waverly School =

Independent, college-prep school in Pasadena, California, United States

Coordinates: 34.138628°N 118.151974°W

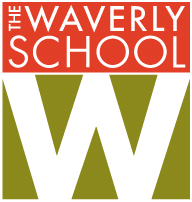
- 67 W. Bellevue Drive; Pasadena, California 91105; United States

Information
- Type: Independent, Day, College-prep
- Established: 1993
- Head of school: Clarke Weatherspoon
- Faculty: 35
- Grades: Preschool-12
- Enrollment: 360
- Student to teacher ratio: Preschool: 8:1; Elementary school: 12:1; Middle school: 11:1; High school: 11:1
- Accreditation: Western Association of Schools and Colleges, California Association of Independent Schools
- Website: thewaverlyschool.org

The Waverly School is an independent, co-educational day school in Pasadena, California , with approximately 360 students from preschool through grade 12. Founded in 1993, the school provides a college-preparatory program divided into preschool, elementary school, middle school, and high school.

== Accreditation ==
The school is accredited by the Western Association of Schools and Colleges and the California Association of Independent Schools. It is also a member of the Independent School Alliance, People of Color in Independent Schools, and A Better Chance.

== Programs ==
=== Preschool ===
Waverly's preschool program is licensed by the California Department of Social Services, and is designed for children ages 3 and a half to 5 years old. Preschool students spend approximately half the day outdoors in unstructured play. Enrollment is limited to 24 students.

=== Elementary school ===
Kindergarten through sixth grade are taught in self‑contained classrooms staffed by a lead teacher and an associate teacher. Beginning in first grade, most classrooms are multi‑age and dual‑grade (e.g., first and second graders are taught in the same room). The average student-teacher ratio is 12:1.

=== Middle school ===
The middle school contains grades seven and eight. Their curriculum is delivered by multiple core educators specializing in different subjects.

=== High school ===
The high school follows a college-preparatory program. Graduation requirements are aligned with the ‘A–G’ entrance requirements for the University of California. The school is a member of the California Interscholastic Federation (CIF).

== Facilities ==
=== Organic Farm ===
The school maintains a one-acre organic farm at 665 South Pasadena Avenue. The farm serves as a site for activities such as wildlife observation, science experiments, and writing projects. Teachers may request the use of designated garden plots for class activities.
