= Grinnell System =

Basketball Offense technique

The Grinnell System, sometimes referred to as The System, is a fast-tempo style of basketball developed by coach David Arseneault at Grinnell College. It is a variation of the run-and-gun system popularized by coach Paul Westhead at Loyola Marymount University in the early 1980s. The Grinnell System relies on shooting three-point field goals, applying constant pressure with a full-court press, and substituting players frequently.

== Origin ==
In 1989, Arseneault inherited a Grinnell program with no winning season in the past 25 years. After trying traditional eight-player rotations for a few years, he felt Grinnell needed to change its basketball philosophy to rejuvenate the team and have more fun. Grinnell was a Division III school that did not offer athletic scholarships, and players who did not receive playing time were quitting. Arseneault developed the Grinnell System, which incorporated a dozen or more players in a game. According to his son, David Jr., who played and later coached under his father at Grinnell, Arseneault did not believe the system would be a competitive strategy, but thought the increased scoring would develop a more positive environment even if the team lost. Through 2012, Grinnell won five conference championships, advanced to the postseason 11 times, and led the nation in scoring at all levels of college basketball in 17 of the past 19 seasons.

Under the system, Grinnell guard Jack Taylor scored an NCAA-record 138 points in a 2012 game, and 109 in a 2013 game. Previously, Grinnell players Jeff Clement (77) and Griffin Lentsch (89) held the Division III scoring record.

== Strategy ==
The main tenets of the system are:

1. The first possible shot is the best possible shot, where three-point field goal attempts are preferred over shorter shots.
2. Shoot as many three-pointers as possible.
3. In terms of defense, giving up an uncontested layup is better than a shot clock violation.
4. Always double team the person with the ball.
5. Every player but the shooter goes for the offensive rebound.
6. Offensive rebounds should be sent back for another three-point attempt, not a shorter putback for two points.

Unlike Westhead's system, in which any open player takes a shot, the Grinnell System has a designated shooter on the court. The system employs a constant full-court press on defense. While opponents get easy baskets when they beat the press, the team receives the ball back sooner to attempt a three-pointer. The goal is to get significantly more shots than the opponent by forcing more turnovers and getting more offensive rebounds. When a player misses, Arseneault believed that rebounding the ball and giving the player the same shot within ten seconds usually resulted in a basket. The overall goal of the system is to take 100 shots, make half the shots 3-point attempts, force 32 turnovers, rebound one-third of the team's own misses, and outshoot the opponents by 30 attempts.

To keep his players fresh and get more individuals involved, Arseneault added to Westhead's system by substituting players in three waves of five players, similar to an ice hockey shift. A 15-man roster is divided into three groups of five and new shifts are substituted every 45 to 90 seconds. Each shift plays at full speed and then rests while the next group does the same. Players rarely play more than 20 minutes a game.

Arseneault and the Grinnell program have been criticized for using the system to run up the score and set records, especially against overmatched opponents.

== Usage outside Grinnell ==
Other college and high school programs have also adopted the Grinnell System. David Arseneault Jr., the coach's son, ran a modified version of The System after being named the head coach of the Reno Bighorns of the NBA Development League in 2014–15. Limited to a 10-man roster and subject to the D-League's high roster turnover, Arseneault adjusted the system, abandoning its hockey-style substitutions and full-court press.

== See also ==
- Nellie Ball
- 1992 Troy State vs. DeVry men's basketball game
