= David Arseneault Jr. =

American–Canadian basketball player and coach

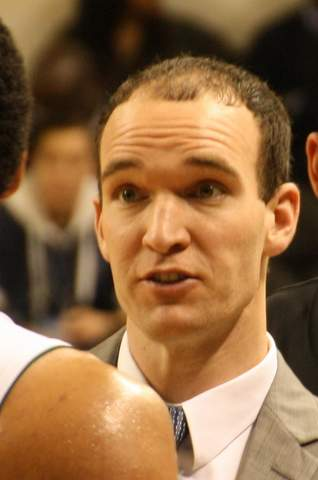
- Arseneault Jr. with the Reno Bighorns in 2016

Grinnell Pioneers
- Title: Head coach
- League: Midwest Conference

Personal information
- Born: July 18, 1986 (age 40) Toronto, Ontario
- Listed height: 6 ft 2 in (1.88 m)

Career information
- High school: Grinnell (Grinnell, Iowa)
- College: Grinnell (2005–2009)
- NBA draft: 2009: undrafted
- Playing career: 2010–2011
- Position: Point guard
- Coaching career: 2009–present

Career history

Playing
- 2010–2011: TV Hohenlimburg

Coaching
- 2009–2012: Grinnell (assistant)
- 2012–2014: Grinnell (associate HC)
- 2014–2016: Reno Bighorns
- 2016–2018: Grinnell (interim)
- 2018–present: Grinnell

Career highlights
- As player: First-team All-Midwest Conference (2007); 2× Second-team All-Midwest Conference (2008, 2009)

David Norman Arseneault (born July 18, 1986), also known as David Arseneault Jr., is an American–Canadian basketball coach who is the head coach for the Grinnell Pioneers. He previously played college basketball for the Pioneers under his father, David Sr., and later served as an associate head coach under him at Grinnell. Arseneault was later the head coach of the Reno Bighorns in the NBA Development League for two seasons (2014–2016) before returning to Grinnell. He became the Pioneers' head coach after his father retired in 2018.

== Early life and education ==
Arseneault was born in Toronto, and is a dual citizen of Canada and the United States. He played basketball at Grinnell High School before attending Grinnell College. As a player under his dad's fast-paced Grinnell System, Arseneault was named a three-time finalist for the Bob Cousy Award, which is given annually to the nation's top point guard. In 2008, he set an NCAA record with 34 assists in a 151–112 victory over North Central University. He finished his college career at Grinnell as the Division III leader in career assists average (9.4).

== Coaching career ==
Upon graduating in 2009, Arseneault started as an assistant coach under his dad at Grinnell in the fall of the same year. He also played one year in a semi-professional league in Germany with TV Hohenlimburg. Arseneault was named the interim coach starting in the second semester of the 2011–12 season while the elder Arseneault was on sabbatical leave. He was named an associate head coach in the 2012–13 season. The Express-Times that season wrote that Arseneault "essentially runs the program." In 2013–14, Rick Reilly of ESPN wrote that Arseneault "does the coaching" while his father "watches three feet from the far end of the bench, sometimes with his granddaughter on his lap." Arseneault was also an assistant coach for women's and men's golf at Grinnell, as well as an assistant softball and American football coach.

On October 17, 2014, Arseneault was named the head coach for the Reno Bighorns. He planned to run a modified version of the Grinnell System, and called the upcoming season an "experiment". Limited to a 10-man roster and subject to the D-League's high roster turnover, Arseneault adjusted the system, abandoning its hockey-style substitutions and full-court press. He coached two years with Reno, leading the league in scoring in both seasons while compiling a 55–47 overall record. The team was 33–17 in 2015–16, which was one win short of the franchise record. After the season, Arsenault's contract was not renewed.

Arsenault returned to Grinnell as their interim head coach for 2016–17, when his father was scheduled to be on another sabbatical leave. He became the Pioneers' head coach after the elder Areseneault retired in June 2018.
