= Crossroads College =

- Type: independent, coed
- Active: 1913–2016
- Endowment: $744,600
- President: Mike Kilgallin
- Faculty: 25
- Students: 184
- Location: 1765 Restoration Road SW; Rochester, Minnesota 55902, United States; 43°59′48″N 092°28′41″W
- Campus: urban, 40 acres (16 ha)
- Mascot: Knights
- Website: http://www.crossroadscollege.edu/

Crossroads College (originally International Christian Bible College and later Minnesota Bible College) was a four-year, coeducational Christian college in Rochester, Minnesota, United States. It was founded in 1913 and ceased offering classes in the fall of 2016. Crossroads formed a partnership with Hope International University in 2018 . In the Fall of 2020 Crossroads College rebranded to become Crossroads Church Partners and continues to develop Christian Leaders and provide resources to strengthen churches.

Crossroads was nondenominational, drawing students from a variety of Christian denominations, especially Christian churches and churches of Christ.

== History ==
Its roots are in the International Christian Bible College (1913) founded by David E. Olson in Minneapolis, which later was renamed Minneapolis Bible College (1924), then Minnesota Bible University (1932), and Minnesota Bible College (1942). In 1971 it moved to its current location in Rochester. In 2002 it was renamed Crossroads College.

Crossroads' original building is still a landmark in Minneapolis, standing at the corner of University Avenue and 15th Street, across from the main gates of the University of Minnesota. Affectionately named, "The Dinky Dome" because of the proximity of the building to Dinkytown in SE Minneapolis, the dome was recently sold to developers who will remodel the original building and add an apartment and shopping complex to the north of the building. The site is distinctive by its large pillars that face University Avenue, but also the large dome that sits above the building's three stories - this dome has served as a landmark for the area since 1913.

Crossroads College's most recent campus in Rochester, Minnesota, was located in Southwest Rochester on 40 acres (16 ha) of wooded land. Accessed via Mayowood Road and 16th Street SW near Apache Mall, this campus offered one of the best vistas of Southwest Rochester. On campus was an academic building overlooking a small lake, library and student center, music studio, and multiple townhouses for students. Touch football was played informally on the top of the hill over the campus, and broomball was played in the winter on the pond below the campus. Alumnus Daniel Christensen had brooms purchased, learned the rulebook, and set up teams for an enjoyable intramural sport in the winter months. The college also played volleyball in Rochester, with the best team composed of alumni of MBC and coached by Mark Comeaux.

In August 2016, the college announced it would not open for the scheduled fall semester, citing low enrollment.

== Sports, clubs, and traditions ==
Crossroads College fielded teams in men's and women's basketball. The school belonged to both the National Christian College Athletic Association (NCCAA) and the Association of Christian College Athletics (ACCA).

Student groups included:

- The Ambassadors, a mission group
- Chorale
- International Students Fellowship
- Outreach Teams, including Adoration Vocal Ensemble and three worship bands
- Student Council
- Xiphos, the student-led newspaper

== Presidents ==
- David E. Olson, 1913-1924
- Eugene C. Sanderson, 1924-1932
- Floyd Jones, 1932-1936
- Paul A. Millard, 1936-1944
- Russell E. Boatman, 1945-1961
- Lynn D. Dietz 1961-1962
- Harry Poll, 1962-1964
- Galen Skinner, 1965-1973
- Bruce Miller, 1973-1985
- Donald R. Lloyd, 1985-1995
- Robert W. Cash, 1995-2003
- Bill Luce, Jr., 2003-2006
- Mike Benson, 2006-2008 (Interim)
- Mike Kilgallin, 2008–2016

== See also ==
- List of colleges and universities in Minnesota
- Higher education in Minnesota
