= Iowa Highway 224 =

State highway in Iowa, United States

Iowa Highway 224
- Iowa 224 highlighted in red

Route information
- Maintained by Iowa DOT
- Length: 10.587 mi (17.038 km)
- Existed: 1930–present

Major junctions
- South end: I-80 near Kellogg
- US 6 near Kellogg
- North end: Iowa 14 north of Kellogg

Location
- Country: United States
- State: Iowa
- Counties: Jasper

Highway system
- Iowa Primary Highway System; Interstate; US; State; Secondary; Scenic
← Iowa 220	→ I-235

Iowa Highway 224 (Iowa 224) is a state highway in central Iowa. It begins at Iowa 224 eight miles (13 km) north of Kellogg and ends 2 miles (3.2 km) south of Kellogg at exit 173 along Interstate 80 (I-80). It intersects U.S. Highway 6 (US 6) near Kellogg. The highway, in conjunction with Iowa 14, is the most direct route from I-80 to Marshalltown.

== Route description ==
Iowa 224 begins at a diamond interchange along I-80. From I-80, Iowa 224 travels north 1 3/4 miles (2.8 km) to an intersection with US 6 just south of Kellogg. On the southern edge of Kellogg, it crosses the North Skunk River and a line of the Iowa Interstate Railroad. Iowa 224 represents the eastern boundary of Kellogg as the vast majority of the town is to the west. North of Kellogg, the highway passes and provides access to Rock Creek State Park, which lies three miles (4.8 km) to the east. One mile (1.6 km) from its northern end, Iowa 224 breaks from its northerly path and turns west at Jasper County Road E17 (CR E17). It follows this west-leading stretch of highway until its end at Iowa Highway 14.

Iowa 224 to Iowa 14 is the most direct route to Marshalltown from westbound I-80. By avoiding Newton, where I-80 meets Iowa 14, drivers can save 15 miles (24 km).

== History ==
Iowa 224 began as a short spur route connecting Kellogg to US 6. It remained a short spur until 1980, when it was extended along CR T22 south to I-80, and north to CR F17, where it turned west to connect to Iowa 14. These changes first appeared on the 1981 state map published by the Iowa Department of Transportation.

== Major intersections ==
The entire route is in Jasper County.

Location	mi	km	Destinations	Notes
Buena Vista Township	0.000	0.000	I-80 – Des Moines, Davenport	Exit 173 on I-80
Kellogg	1.735	2.792	US 6 – Newton, Grinnell	
Mariposa Township	10.587	17.038	Iowa 14 – Laurel, Newton, Marshalltown	
1.000 mi = 1.609 km; 1.000 km = 0.621 mi
