= Bucksbaum Center for the Arts =

Coordinates: 41.746°N 92.721°W

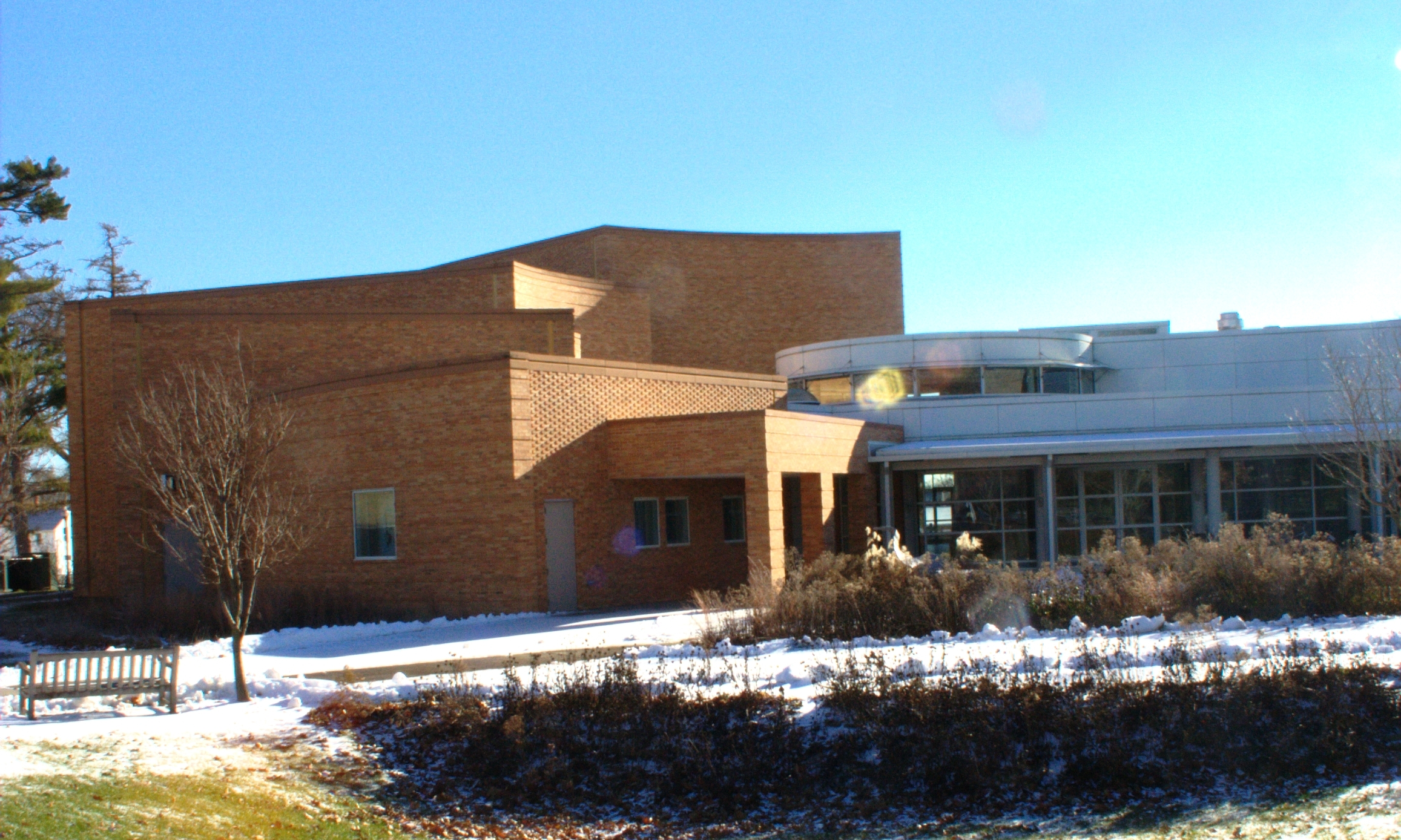
Bucksbaum viewed from the north. At left is the Sebring-Lewis Recital Hall.

The Bucksbaum Center for the Arts is part of Grinnell College, located in Grinnell, Iowa. The center was completed in May 1999, and actually contains the old Fine Arts complex. The center was designed by renowned architect César Pelli.

The facilities include:

- Grinnell College Museum of Art – A 7,420-square-foot (689 m^{2}) gallery space that houses the college's Permanent Collection as well as traveling exhibitions. The gallery was originally named Faulconer Gallery after donors Vernon and Amy Faulconer.
- Sebring-Lewis Recital Hall – A 4,050-square-foot (376 m^{2}) concert hall.
- Flanagan Studio Theatre – A 2,000-square-foot (190 m^{2}) theatre (formerly the Arena Stage), named for Federal Theatre Project director and 1911 Grinnell graduate Hallie Flanagan.
- Roberts Theatre – A traditional thrust-stage theatre that seats 450 people.
- Wall Performance Lab – A black box theatre.
- 6 fully equipped art studios, in addition to a computer lab, scene shop, dance studio, and 15 practice rooms.
Bucksbaum Center

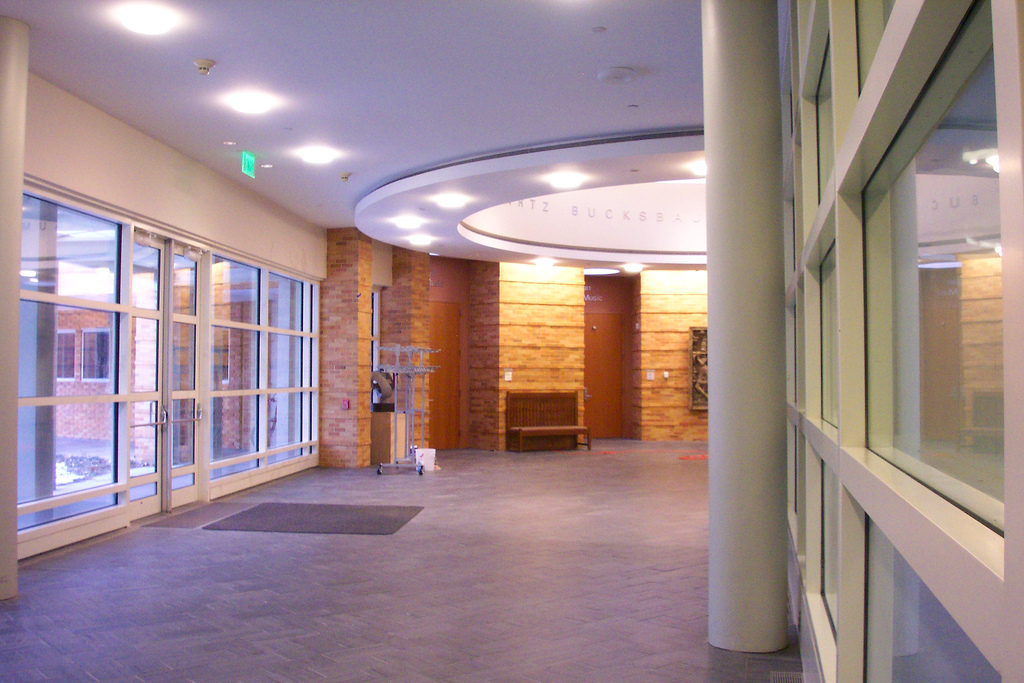
The rotunda outside Sebring-Lewis Hall, as seen from the direction of the Wall Lab

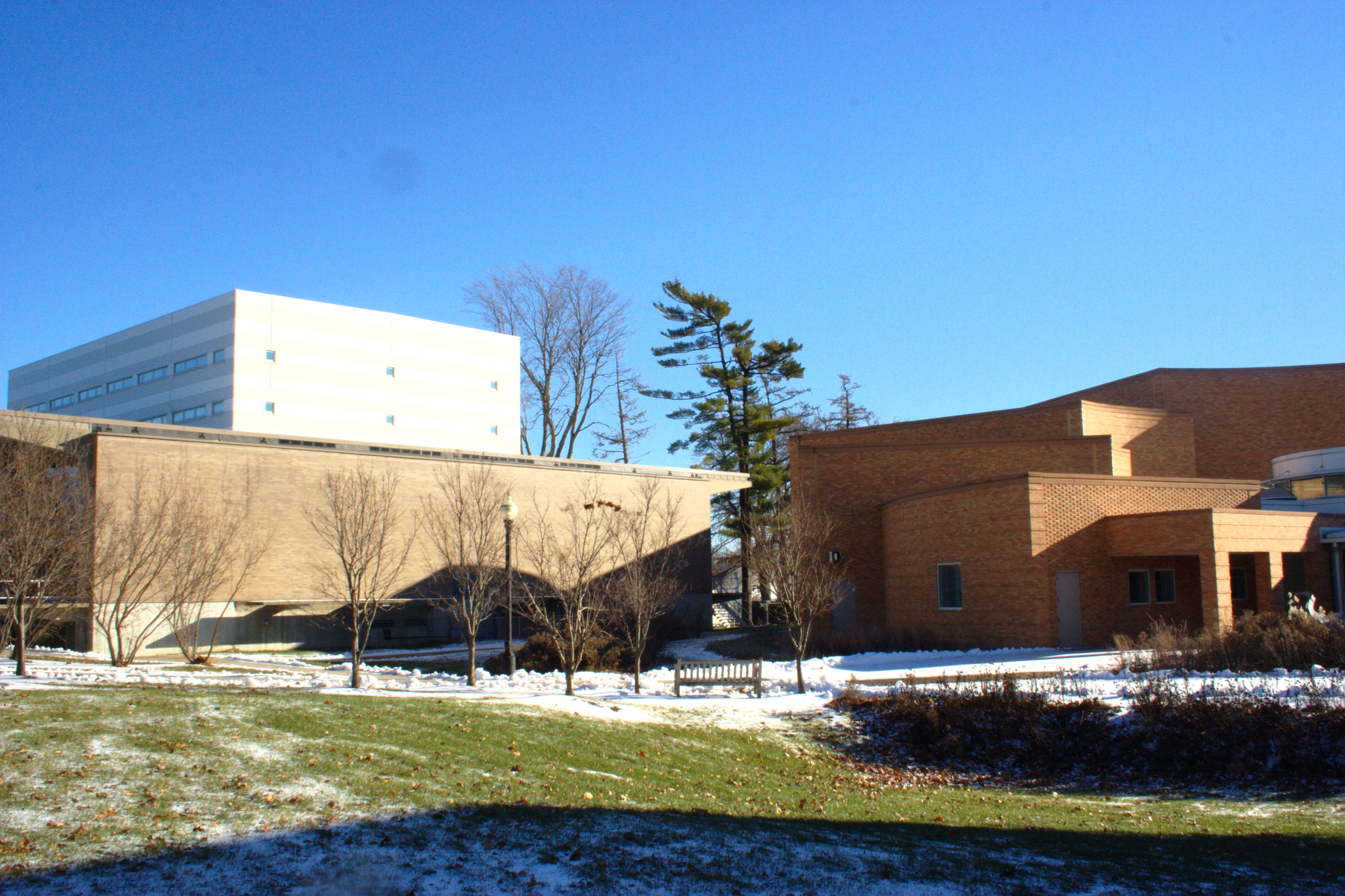
The outdoor performance space is in the foreground at right, and Burling Library is visible at left.
