= Rock Creek State Park =

State park in Iowa, United States

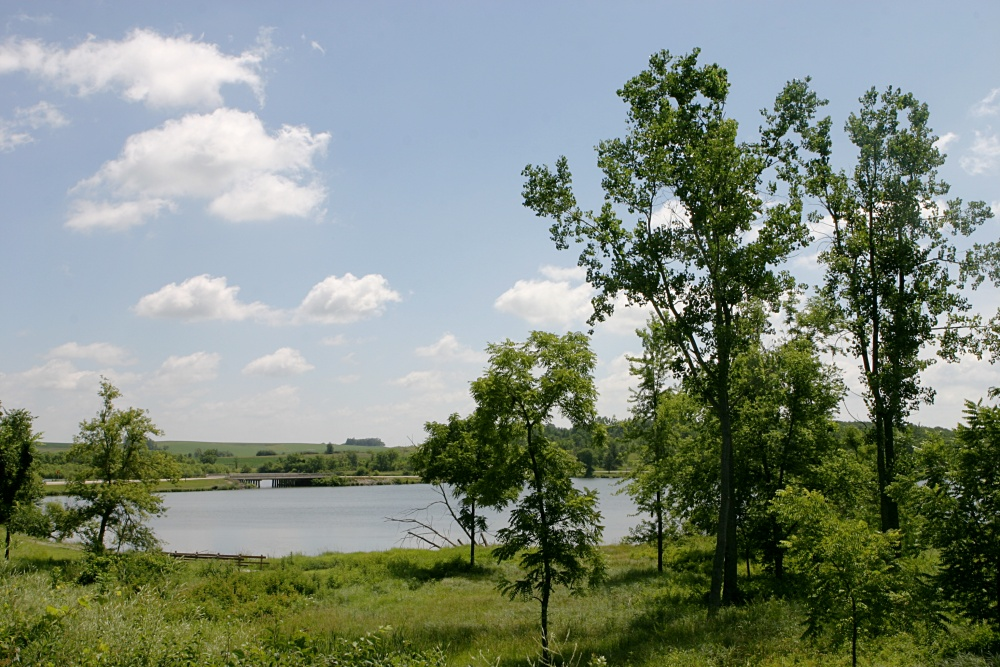

- Location within Iowa Location within the United States
- Location: Jasper County, Iowa, United States
- Nearest city: Kellogg, Iowa
- Coordinates: 41°44′31″N 92°50′55″W
- Area: 1,697 acres (687 ha)
- Elevation: 873 ft (266 m)
- Established: 1952
- Administrator: Iowa Department of Natural Resources
- Website: Official website

Rock Creek State Park is a state park in Jasper County, Iowa, United States, located near the city of Kellogg.

The 1,697-acre (687 ha) park was dedicated in 1952 and includes numerous boat launches and docks, picnic grounds, camping grounds, and trails for horseback riding and hiking. In the winter, the 602-acre (244 ha) lake may freeze over, and the park is a popular spot for cross-country skiing and snowmobiling.

Grinnell is located 7 miles (11 km) to the east. The park's proximity to the town as well as a connecting bike path make the park a popular destination for students at Grinnell College.

Fishing is a common activity at Rock Creek, Fish species record

ed include black and white crappie, largemouth bass, white bass, channel catfish, black bullhead, bluegill, green sunfish, freshwater drum, and walleye. Golden shiners also have a small population here, two large golden shiners were caught while fishing for panfish.
