= Kellogg, Iowa =

- City
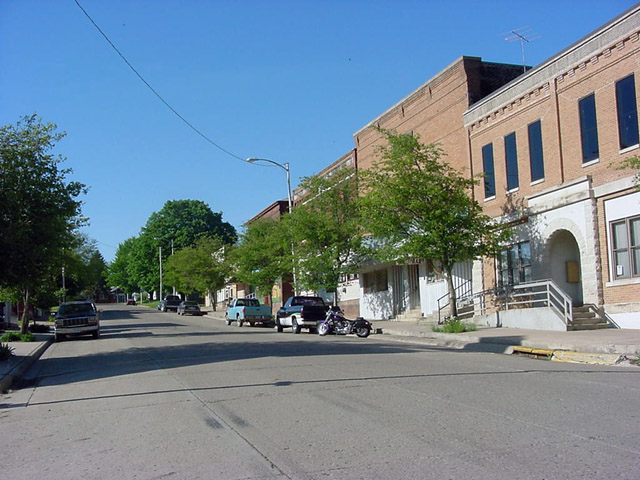
- Downtown Kellogg

- Location of Kellogg, Iowa
- Coordinates: 41°43′0″N 92°54′27″W
- Country: United States
- State: Iowa
- County: Jasper

Area
  - Total: 0.37 sq mi (0.96 km^{2})
  - Land: 0.37 sq mi (0.96 km^{2})
  - Water: 0 sq mi (0.00 km^{2})
- Elevation: 896 ft (273 m)

Population (2020)
  - Total: 606
  - Density: 1,634.2/sq mi (630.96/km^{2})
- Time zone: UTC-6 (Central (CST))
  - Summer (DST): UTC-5 (CDT)
- ZIP code: 50135
- Area code: 641
- FIPS code: 19-40440
- GNIS feature ID: 0458031
- Website: www.kellogg-iowa.com

Kellogg is a city in Jasper County, Iowa, United States. The population was 606 at the time of the 2020 census. It was originally named Manning's Station, then carried the names Jasper City, Kimball, and then finally Kellogg, named for the pioneer settler Judge Abel Avery Kellogg.

== History ==
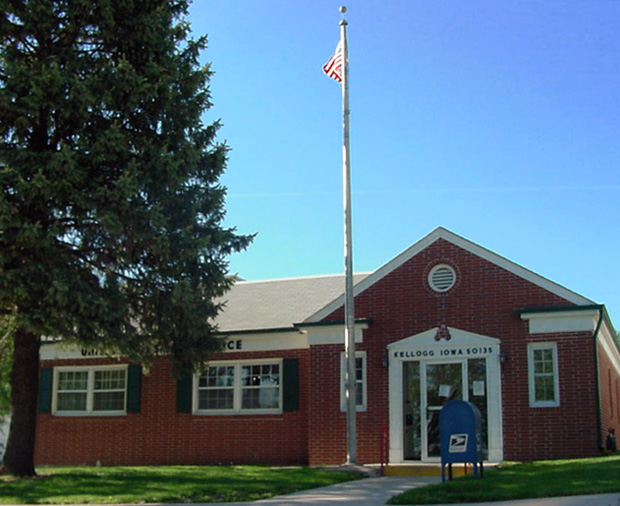
Post office in Kellogg

Kellogg was laid out in 1865 in anticipation of the Mississippi and Missouri Railroad being built through that territory. The railroad reached the town in 1866 and it was designated a station on the line. The terminus of the railroad remained in Kellogg for some time, fueling the early growth of the town.

Today, one of Kellogg's most notable features is the five-building Kellogg Museum complex. Its main building is the former Simpson Hotel, constructed in 1909. The museum complex also boasts an original one-room schoolhouse and a country church.

== Geography ==
Kellogg is located at 41°43′00″N 92°54′27″W (41.716641, -92.907563).

According to the United States Census Bureau, the city has a total area of 0.37 square miles (0.96 km^{2}), all land.

Highway 224 forms Kellogg's eastern boundary. The North Skunk River runs southeasterly along the town's southern edge.

=== ZIP codes ===
All addresses within Kellogg fall under the 50135 ZIP code. Most individuals receive mail at a post office box rather than at their residence.

=== Streets and addresses ===
Kellogg's streets are labeled by name and number, for example, "Adair St." and "1st St." House numbers originate at the southeast corner of the town and increase as one moves west or north. Kellogg's business district, including the Kellogg Museum complex, is located on High St.

== Demographics ==
Historical populations
Year	Pop.	±%
1880	772	—
1890	700	−9.3%
1900	653	−6.7%
1910	610	−6.6%
1920	603	−1.1%
1930	580	−3.8%
1940	648	+11.7%
1950	670	+3.4%
1960	623	−7.0%
1970	607	−2.6%
1980	654	+7.7%
1990	626	−4.3%
2000	606	−3.2%
2010	599	−1.2%
2020	606	+1.2%
Source:"U.S. Census website". United States Census Bureau. and Iowa Data Center; Source: U.S. Decennial Census

=== 2020 census ===
As of the census of 2020, there were 606 people, 262 households, and 158 families residing in the city. The population density was 1,634.2 inhabitants per square mile (631.0/km^{2}). There were 288 housing units at an average density of 776.6 per square mile (299.9/km^{2}). The racial makeup of the city was 94.1% White, 0.0% Black or African American, 0.5% Native American, 0.8% Asian, 0.2% Pacific Islander, 0.8% from other races and 3.6% from two or more races. Hispanic or Latino persons of any race comprised 2.1% of the population.

Of the 262 households, 29.0% of which had children under the age of 18 living with them, 43.9% were married couples living together, 12.2% were cohabitating couples, 19.1% had a female householder with no spouse or partner present and 24.8% had a male householder with no spouse or partner present. 39.7% of all households were non-families. 32.1% of all households were made up of individuals, 12.2% had someone living alone who was 65 years old or older.

The median age in the city was 42.9 years. 22.3% of the residents were under the age of 20; 4.3% were between the ages of 20 and 24; 25.9% were from 25 and 44; 28.7% were from 45 and 64; and 18.8% were 65 years of age or older. The gender makeup of the city was 51.2% male and 48.8% female.

=== 2010 census ===
As of the census of 2010, there were 599 people, 261 households, and 160 families living in the city. The population density was 1,618.9 inhabitants per square mile (625.1/km^{2}). There were 299 housing units at an average density of 808.1 per square mile (312.0/km^{2}). The racial makeup of the city was 98.2% White, 0.2% African American, 0.2% Native American, 0.5% Asian, 0.8% from other races, and 0.2% from two or more races. Hispanic or Latino of any race were 2.2% of the population.

There were 261 households, of which 26.4% had children under the age of 18 living with them, 51.3% were married couples living together, 8.4% had a female householder with no husband present, 1.5% had a male householder with no wife present, and 38.7% were non-families. 32.2% of all households were made up of individuals, and 10.3% had someone living alone who was 65 years of age or older. The average household size was 2.30 and the average family size was 2.91.

The median age in the city was 40.6 years. 20.9% of residents were under the age of 18; 7.7% were between the ages of 18 and 24; 26.8% were from 25 to 44; 31.7% were from 45 to 64; and 12.7% were 65 years of age or older. The gender makeup of the city was 50.4% male and 49.6% female.

=== 2000 census ===
As of the census of 2000, there were 606 people, 248 households, and 169 families living in the city. The population density was 1,663.0 inhabitants per square mile (642.1/km^{2}). There were 282 housing units at an average density of 773.9 per square mile (298.8/km^{2}). The racial makeup of the city was 98.35% White, 0.17% African American, 0.50% Asian, and 0.99% from two or more races. Hispanic or Latino of any race were 0.83% of the population.

There were 248 households, out of which 34.7% had children under the age of 18 living with them, 53.2% were married couples living together, 11.3% had a female householder with no husband present, and 31.5% were non-families. 27.8% of all households were made up of individuals, and 14.5% had someone living alone who was 65 years of age or older. The average household size was 2.44 and the average family size was 2.96.

26.1% are under the age of 18, 8.4% from 18 to 24, 26.9% from 25 to 44, 23.4% from 45 to 64, and 15.2% who were 65 years of age or older. The median age was 38 years. For every 100 females, there were 96.8 males. For every 100 females age 18 and over, there were 95.6 males.

The median income for a household in the city was $37,000, and the median income for a family was $44,083. Males had a median income of $34,722 versus $23,125 for females. The per capita income for the city was $17,161. About 2.7% of families and 6.0% of the population were below the poverty line, including 7.8% of those under age 18 and 9.4% of those age 65 or over.

== See also ==
- Conard Environmental Research Area
- Rock Creek State Park
