= North Grinnell Historic District =

Historic district in Iowa, United States

- U.S. National Register of Historic Places
- U.S. Historic district
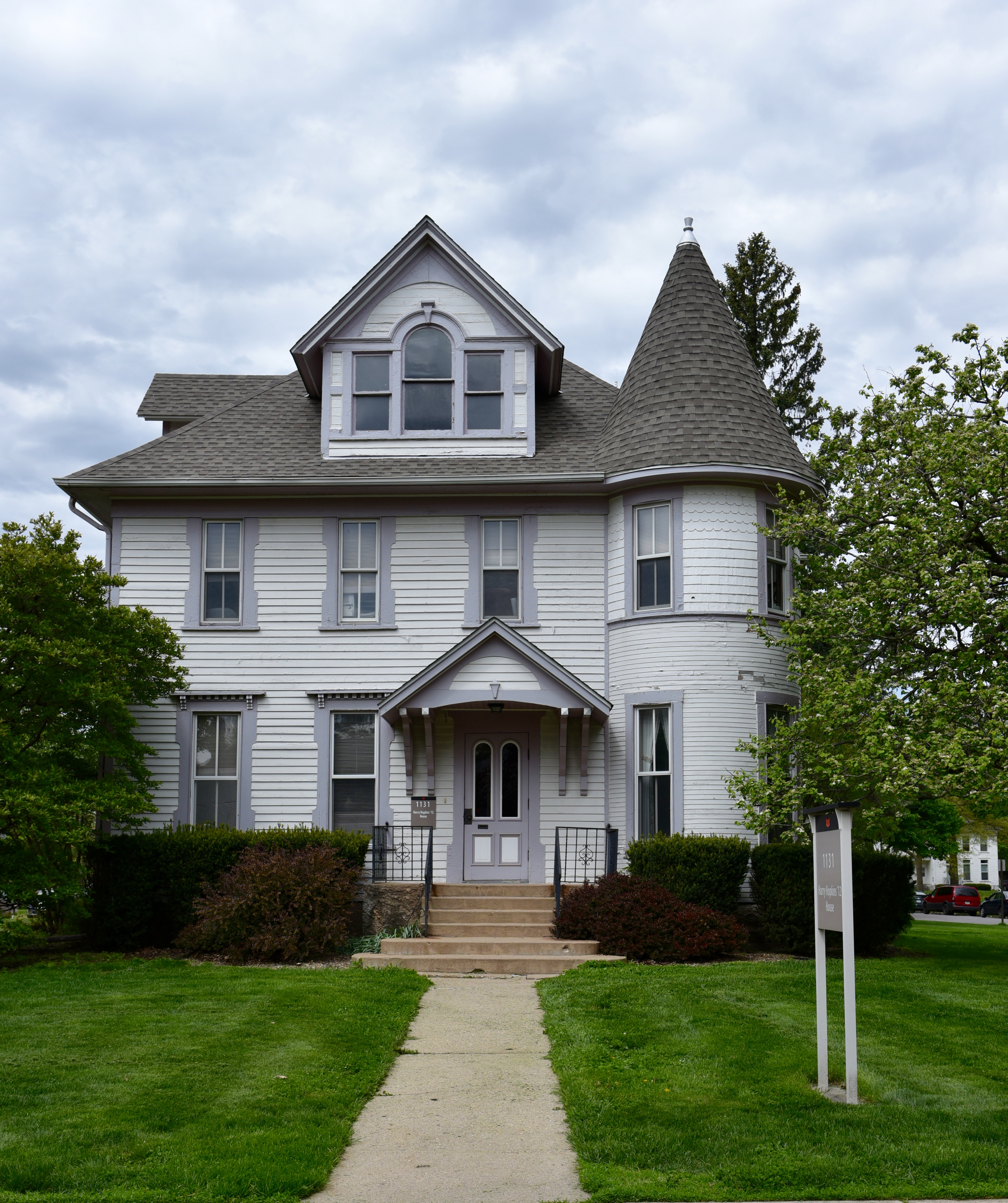

- Location within Iowa Location within the United States
- Location: Park to W. 6th Ave. to 11th Ave., Grinnell, Iowa
- Coordinates: 41°44′59″N 92°43′21″W
- Area: 67.11 acres (27.16 ha)
- Architectural style: Italianate; Queen Anne
- NRHP reference No.: 08001164
- Added to NRHP: December 10, 2008

The North Grinnell Historic District is a nationally recognized historic district located in Grinnell, Iowa, United States. It was listed on the National Register of Historic Places in 2008. At the time of its nomination it contained 272 resources, which included 202 contributing buildings, six contributing objects, 61 non-contributing buildings, and one non-contributing object. The historic district is a residential area located west of the Grinnell College campus. Of the 157 houses, three-quarters of them are two-story structures. The rest are bungalows, cottages, and post-World War II minimal traditional plans. The vast majority of houses are of frame construction, with a few brick, concrete block, stucco and half-timbered claddings. There are 103 outbuildings, which include garages, barns and carriage houses. Three of the most prominent architectural styles include Neoclassical, Queen Anne and American Craftsman. The historical objects are six concrete hitching posts. Eleven architects are known to have houses in the district. The period of significance is 1867 to 1958.
