= Florence Kerr =

Florence Stewart Kerr
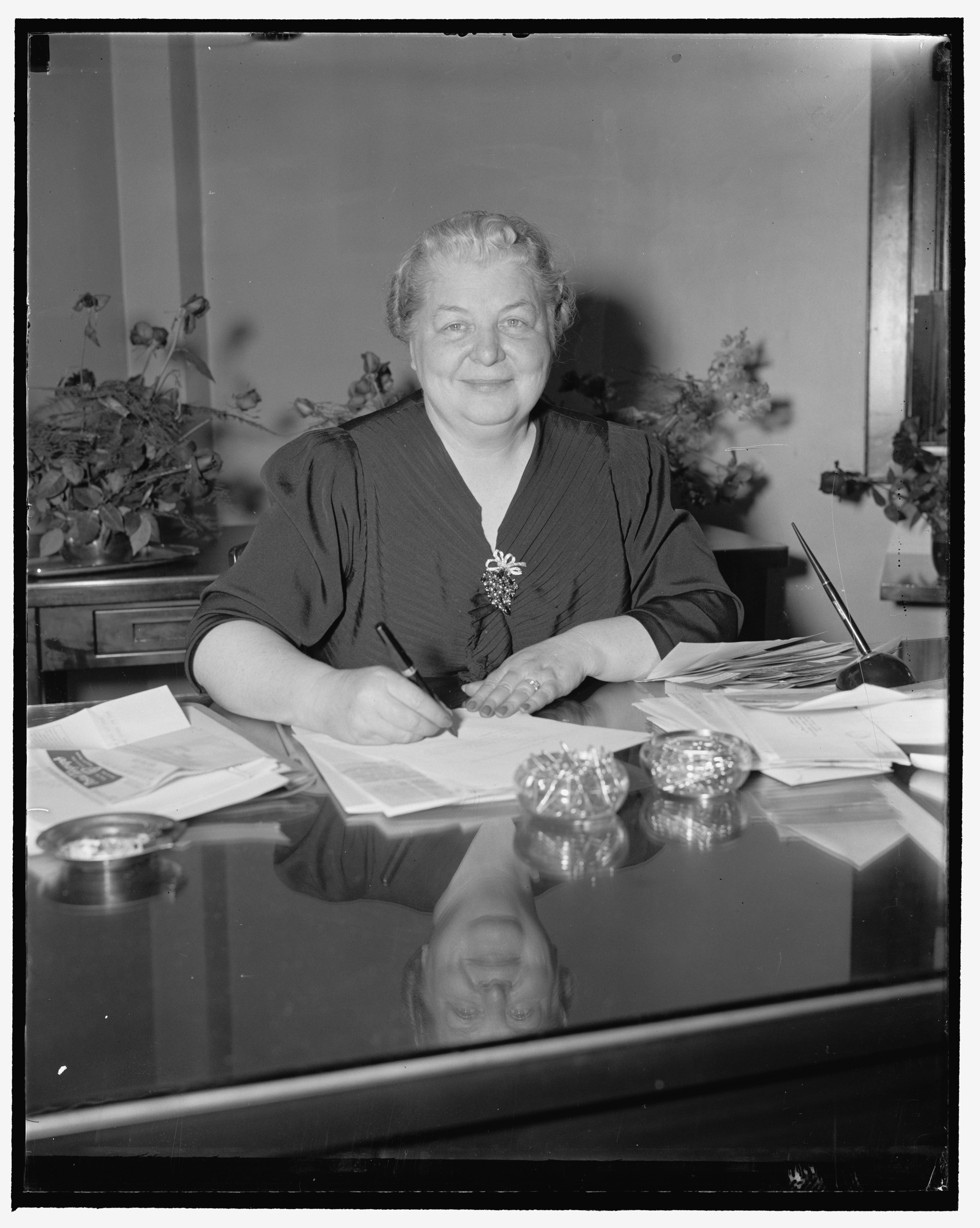
- Born: 30 June 1890; Harriman, Tennessee
- Died: 29 July 1974 (aged 84); Washington, D.C.
- Education: Grinnell College
- Title: Assistant Administrator of the Works Progress Administration

Florence Kerr (1890–1974) was the director of the Women's and Professional Division in the Works Progress Administration (WPA) for the Midwest region.

== Early life and education ==
She grew up in Marshalltown, Iowa, and in 1912 graduated from Grinnell College in the neighboring town of Grinnell. In college, she formed a lifelong friendship with Harry Hopkins, who was later appointed the head of the Works Progress Administration and then the eighth Secretary of Commerce by Franklin D. Roosevelt.

After college, she taught English, was the principal of a high school, and lectured on economics and social problems.

She married a writer and fellow Grinnell College graduate, Robert Kerr. and both worked for Grinnell College. The Kerrs had one daughter, F Elizabeth Kerr. She had an intellectual disability, was institutionalized for most of her life, and died at the age of 11 in 1938.

== Public service ==
Kerr was appointed to the WPA in 1939. The goal of the WPA was to get workers back to work as quickly as possible, while spreading money through the economy to prevent the most severe consequences of poverty. This resulted in limits on the worker, such as only one worker per household being eligible for employment by the WPA at a time, and on the kinds of work they could do, as the jobs needed to match the workers' existing skills and hopefully become a bridge to private-sector employment. There were additional restrictions on women, who could not gain a WPA job unless they were the sole wage earner in the household. Many of the women employed under the Women's and Professional Division were from middle-class marriages and had been abandoned by their husbands.

Kerr thought that although some programs, such as training women as typists, could have some advantages, there were practical problems, including the absence of funding for training and the absence of private-sector jobs as typists once they were trained. Consequently, most of the programs she oversaw, involved sewing projects or other forms of women's work. Sewing was the equivalent of setting men to dig with a shovel, as most women already had at least basic skills. Other jobs in the programs she supervised included working in libraries and recreational programs, as home aides, and doing clerical work, and caregiving, most of which were classified as unskilled work. In 1940, they began a program to train women as nurse's aides. Although the women's program saved many of its workers from destitution during the Great Depression, it never achieved Kerr's progressive hopes of producing long-term improvements to the social and economic status of American women.

In 1939, an appropriations bill tried to push WPA employees back into the private job market by requiring that all of them be dismissed after 18 months of employment by the program. If they were still unemployed and otherwise eligible 60 days after being laid off, then they could be re-hired by the WPA. More than a third of WPA staff lost their jobs within weeks of the rule coming into force. Aside from it being ineffective at the stated goal – fewer than one in eight of the WPA workers laid off in Kerr's home state found private-sector jobs during first months of this rule, and half of the few jobs they did find were at lower wages – Kerr objected to the requirement, saying it caused "hunger, eviction, sickness and despair". However, Kerr's influence in the administration was limited, and the provision was kept through two consecutive budget years.

At the same time, the new head of the WPA, Francis C. Harrington, pushed for more projects that would employ men and less funding for women's programs, and he revised the pay scales in ways that disproportionately harmed women workers, cutting the pay rate for unskilled indoor work, which was mostly done by women, by $3 per month (about 5%), while raising the pay rate for all other classifications, which were dominated by men.

Although budget cuts to the women's program were relentless after 1939, Kerr was able to keep the women's program in operation until the Works Progress Administration was completely closed, in early 1943. After the United States' entry into World War II in late 1941, the focus of women's program shifted to war work. Kerr was successful in advocating for childcare, and in 1942, Congress appropriated US$6,000,000 (equivalent to $118,000,000) to support childcare programs for wartime workers.

Considered the deputy head of the so-called white-collar branch of the Works Progress Administration, her duties were often varied. As Assistant WPA Commissioner, she gave speeches about public health, safe drinking water, and medical care for low-income children on the radio in 1939, and in 1941, Igor Stravinsky sought her help in contacting FDR about a performance of his newly completed arrangement of the national anthem, which he wanted to have performed by a WPA orchestra and broadcast nationwide. As part of her work at the WPA Women's and Professional Projects, she was in regular contact with Eleanor Roosevelt.

Weeks before the WPA closed in 1943, her alma mater awarded her an honorary doctorate of law.

Until the end of WWII, Kerr worked in the war service program of the Federal Works Agency. After the war, she spent a decade as an executive at Northwest Airlines.

== Death ==
She died in 1974. Her grave is in Grinnell, Iowa.

== Legacy ==
The Florence Stewart and Robert Kerr Papers are held by the Grinnell College archives.
