= Conard Environmental Research Area =

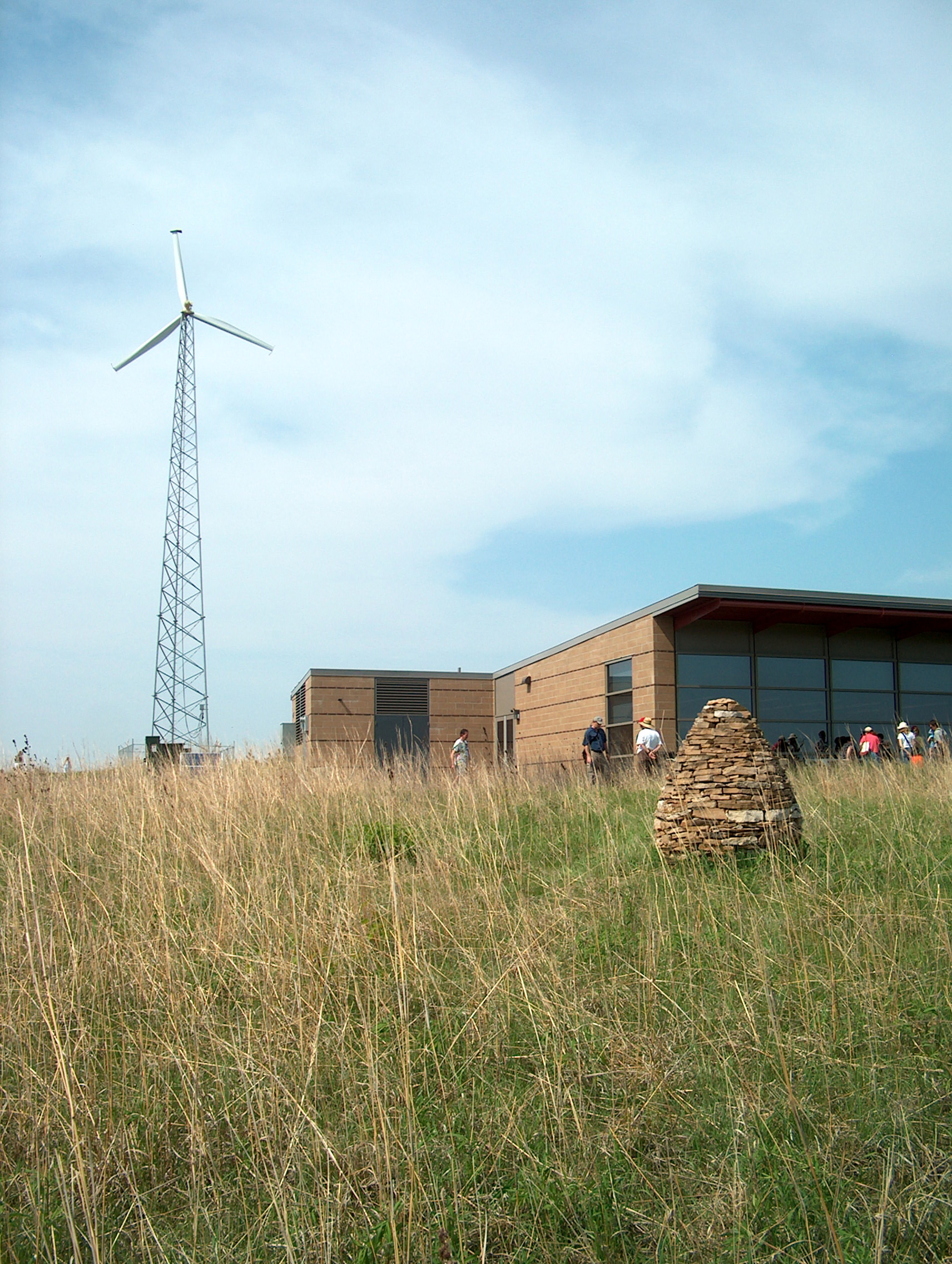
The cairn by Andy Goldsworthy is in the foreground, with the new wind turbine and Environmental Education Center in the background.

The Henry S. Conard Environmental Research Area (CERA) is a protected environmental research facility at 41°41′00″N 92°51′52″W outside Kellogg, Iowa. The 365-acre (148 ha) facility is owned and operated by Grinnell College for class use in the study of ecology and student and faculty research. The preserve is named for Henry S. Conard, a bryologist and ecologist who long served as the chair of the college's Department of Botany. It is located eleven miles from the Grinnell College campus.

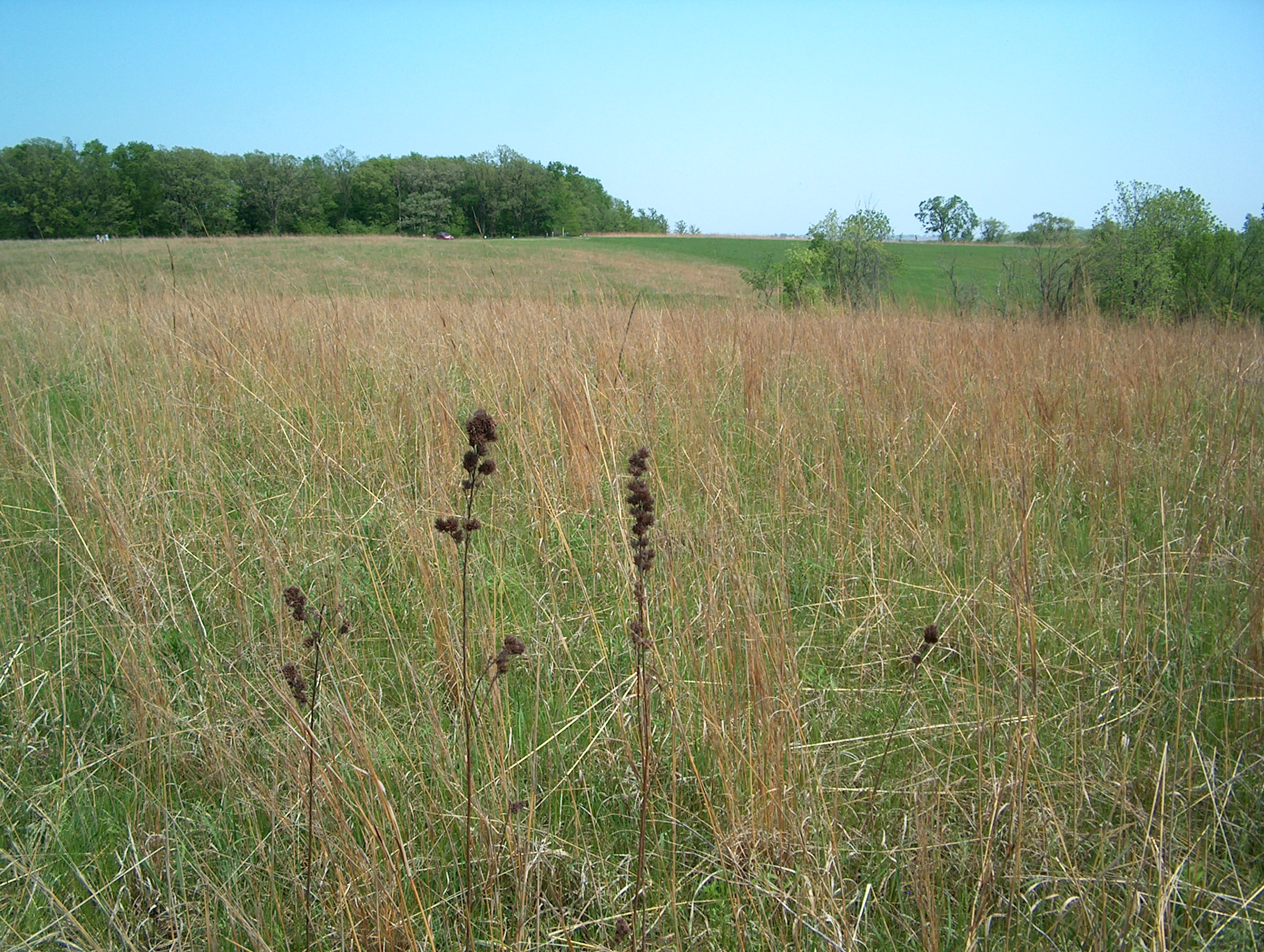
Restored prairie at CERA

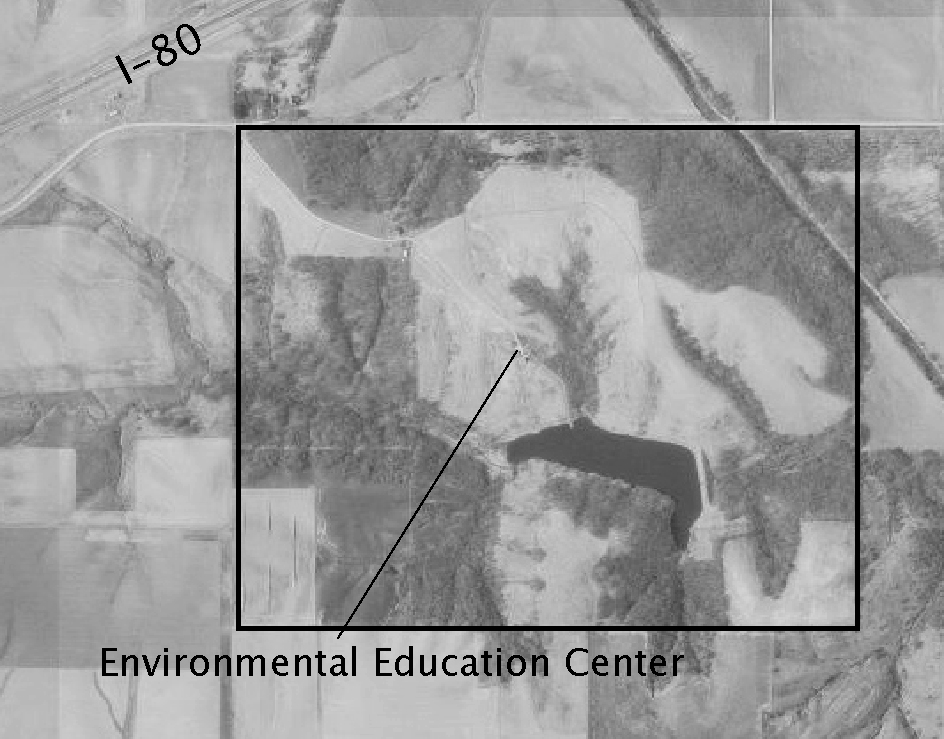
Aerial photo of the site, 1994. Interstate I-80 is at the top left and the Environmental Education Center is indicated by the line at center.

The former cropland currently occupied by CERA was acquired by Grinnell College in 1968, and a decades-long restoration process has slowly restored the site's prairie, woodland, and oak savanna ecosystems. In 2005, a new Environmental Education Center building was built at CERA. Designed by the firm Holabird and Root, the Center's green design earned it the distinction of being the first building in Iowa to receive a Leadership in Energy and Environmental Design (LEED) Gold Rated status.

In addition to its role as an environmental preserve and research area, CERA has hosted several artists and their exhibitions. In 2001, the British sculptor Andy Goldsworthy constructed a stone cairn at the site, one of a series of three across the United States. The cairn, while an example of temporary land art, is expected to last decades and still stands. The cairn was featured on the album cover of The Maccabees' Given to the Wild in 2012. In September 2001, New York photographer Sandy Skoglund led an art installation workshop at the site, creating an installation along one of CERA's trails.
