= Mears Cottage =

- Mears Hall
- U.S. National Register of Historic Places
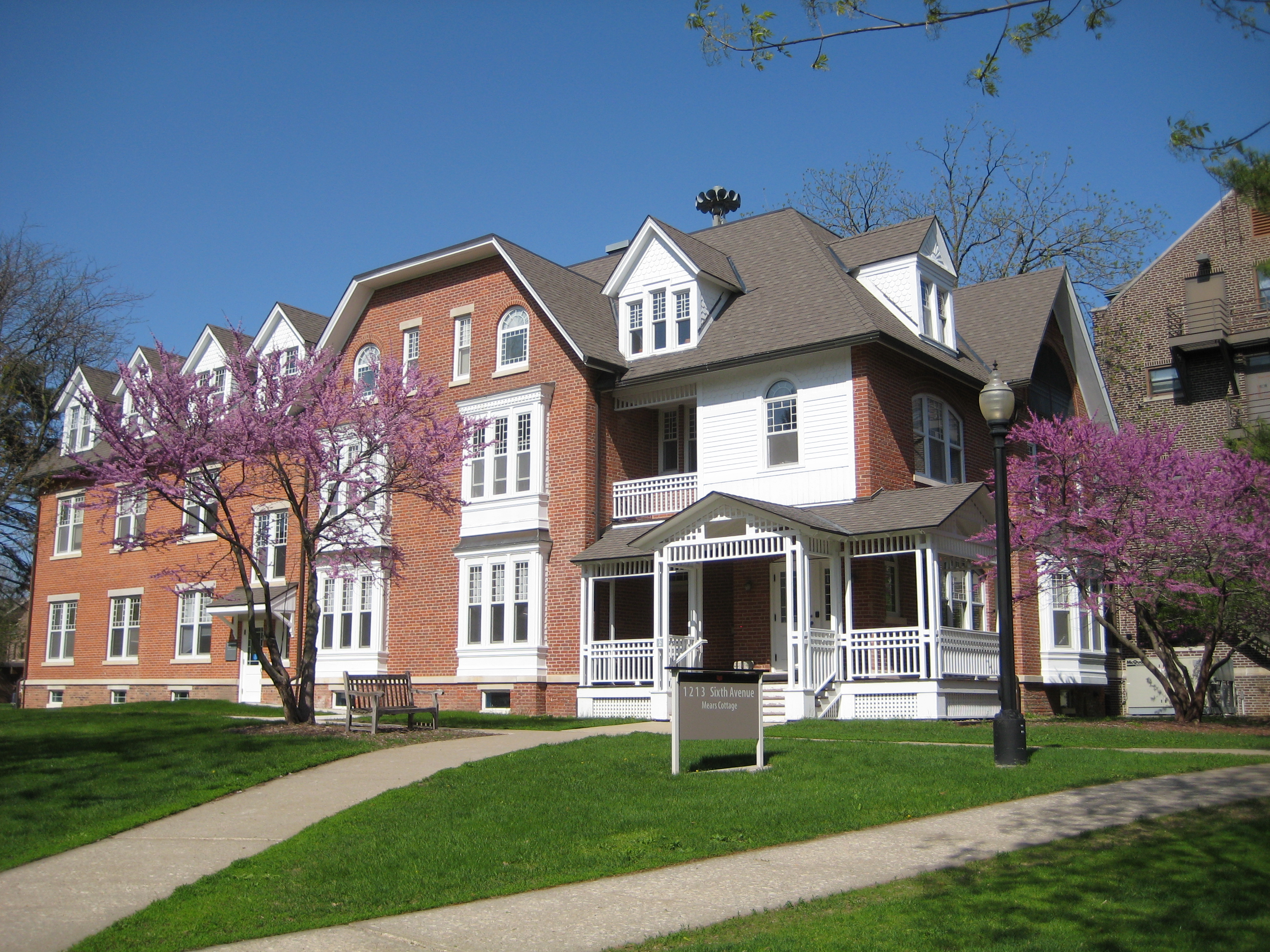

- Location within Iowa Location within the United States
- Location: Grinnell College campus
- Coordinates: 41°44′49″N 92°43′07″W
- Area: less than one acre
- Built: 1888-1889
- Architect: Stephen C. Earle (attributed); Charles D. Marvin
- NRHP reference No.: 79000936
- Added to NRHP: April 26, 1979

Mears Cottage, also known as Mears Hall, is a historic structure located on the Grinnell College campus in Grinnell, Iowa, United States. Originally known as Iowa College, it was the second institution west of the Mississippi River to admit women as students. The first degree was awarded to a woman ten years later. The increase in the number of female students and a destructive tornado that hit the campus in 1882 were the impetus for rebuilding the campus. Edward A. Goodnow, a reformer from Worcester, Massachusetts who promoted public education for women donated the funds to build the cottage-style facility to house female students. It was named for Mary Grinnell Mears, who was the daughter of J.B. and Julia Chapin Grinnell and wife of the Rev. David O. Mears. The building opened on January 1, 1889, with thirty women and a housemother as residents. Each room contained closet space, toilet, medicine cabinet, dresser, study table with attached shelves, chairs, rug and cot. It was the first building on campus with electric lights, installed in the 1890s. New York City architect Charles D. Marvin designed the expansion of the building in 1903, and by 1915 it was connected to other buildings in the women's quadrangle. The building became coed in 1978, and closed the next year because of its deteriorating condition. It sat unused for several years until alumni John H. and Lucile Hanson Harris provided the funds for its renovation. It reopened in 1986. The building was listed on the National Register of Historic Places in 1979.
