= Grinnell College =

Private liberal arts college in Grinnell, Iowa, US

- Former name: Iowa College (1846–1909)
- Motto: Veritas et Humanitas (Latin)
- Motto in English: Truth and Humanity
- Type: Private liberal arts college
- Established: 1846; 180 years ago
- Accreditation: HLC
- Religious affiliation: None (historically related to United Church of Christ)
- Endowment: $2.85 billion (2025)
- President: Anne F. Harris
- Faculty: 223 (Fall 2022)
- Students: 1,759 (Fall 2022)
- Location: Grinnell, Iowa, United States; 41.749057°N 92.72013°W
- Campus: 120 acres (49 ha); Remote town
- Colors: Scarlet and black
- Nickname: Pioneers
- Sporting affiliations: NCAA Division III – Midwest Conference
- Mascot: Squirrel (unofficial)
- Website: www.grinnell.edu

Grinnell College (/ɡrɪnˈɛl/ grin-EL) is a private liberal arts college in Grinnell, Iowa, United States. It was established as Iowa College in 1846 by a group of Congregationalists from New England. It has an "open curriculum," which means students need not follow a prescribed list of classes. The college's 120-acre (49 ha) campus includes several listings on the National Register of Historic Places.

== History ==
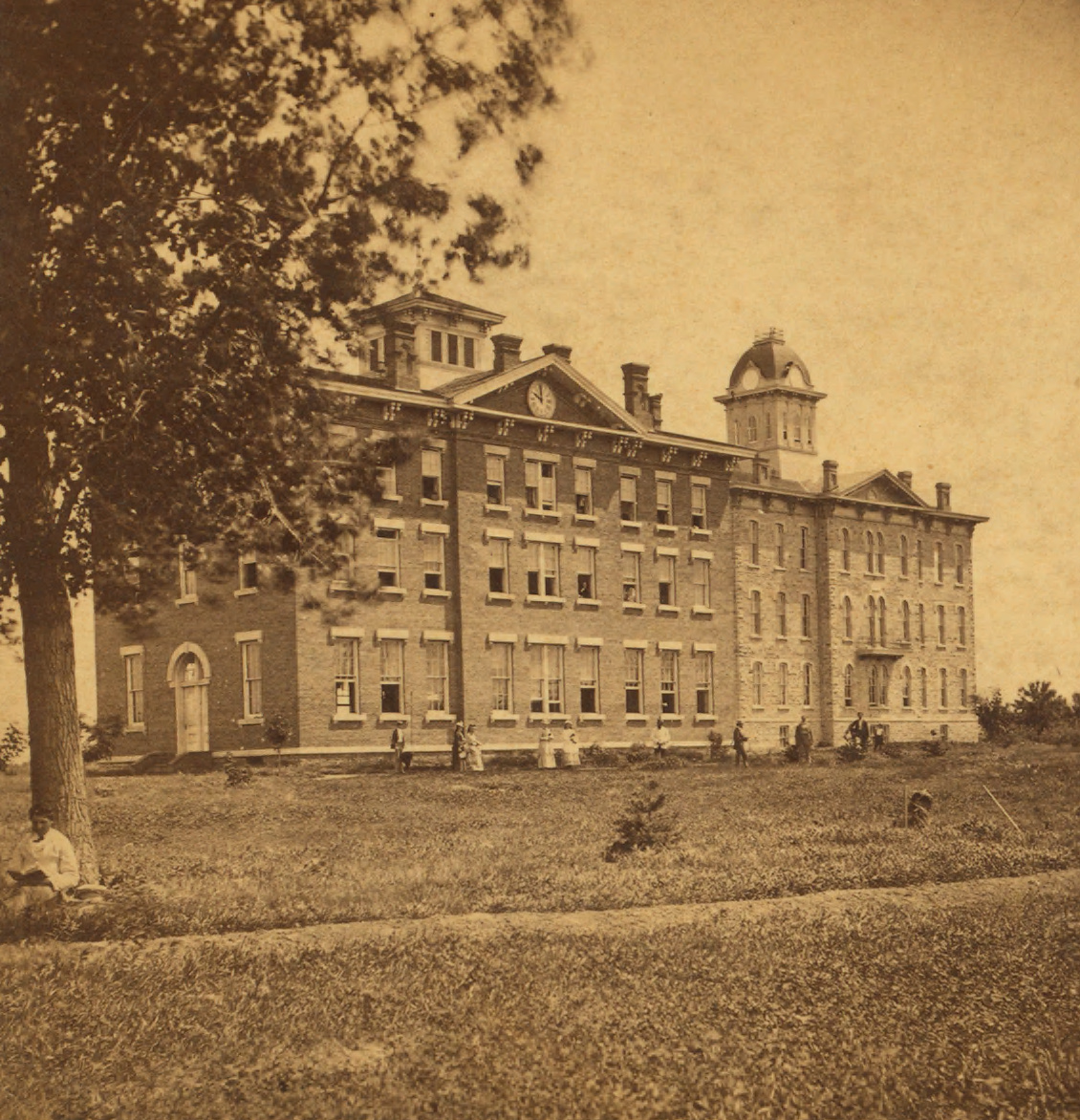
Before the June 17, 1882 tornado that destroyed these buildings

In 1843, eleven Congregational ministers, all of whom trained at Andover Theological Seminary in Massachusetts, set out to preach on the frontier. The group also sought to establish a college, which followed in 1846, when they collectively established Iowa College in Davenport.

The first 25 years of Grinnell's history saw a change in name and location. In Davenport, the college had advocated against slavery and saloons, leading to conflict with the Davenport city council, which retaliated by constructing roads that transected the campus. Iowa College moved farther west from Davenport to the town of Grinnell and unofficially adopted the name of its new home, which itself had been named for the abolitionist minister Josiah Bushnell Grinnell. The name of the corporation, "The Trustees of Iowa College", remained, but in 1909 the name "Grinnell" was adopted by the trustees for the institution.

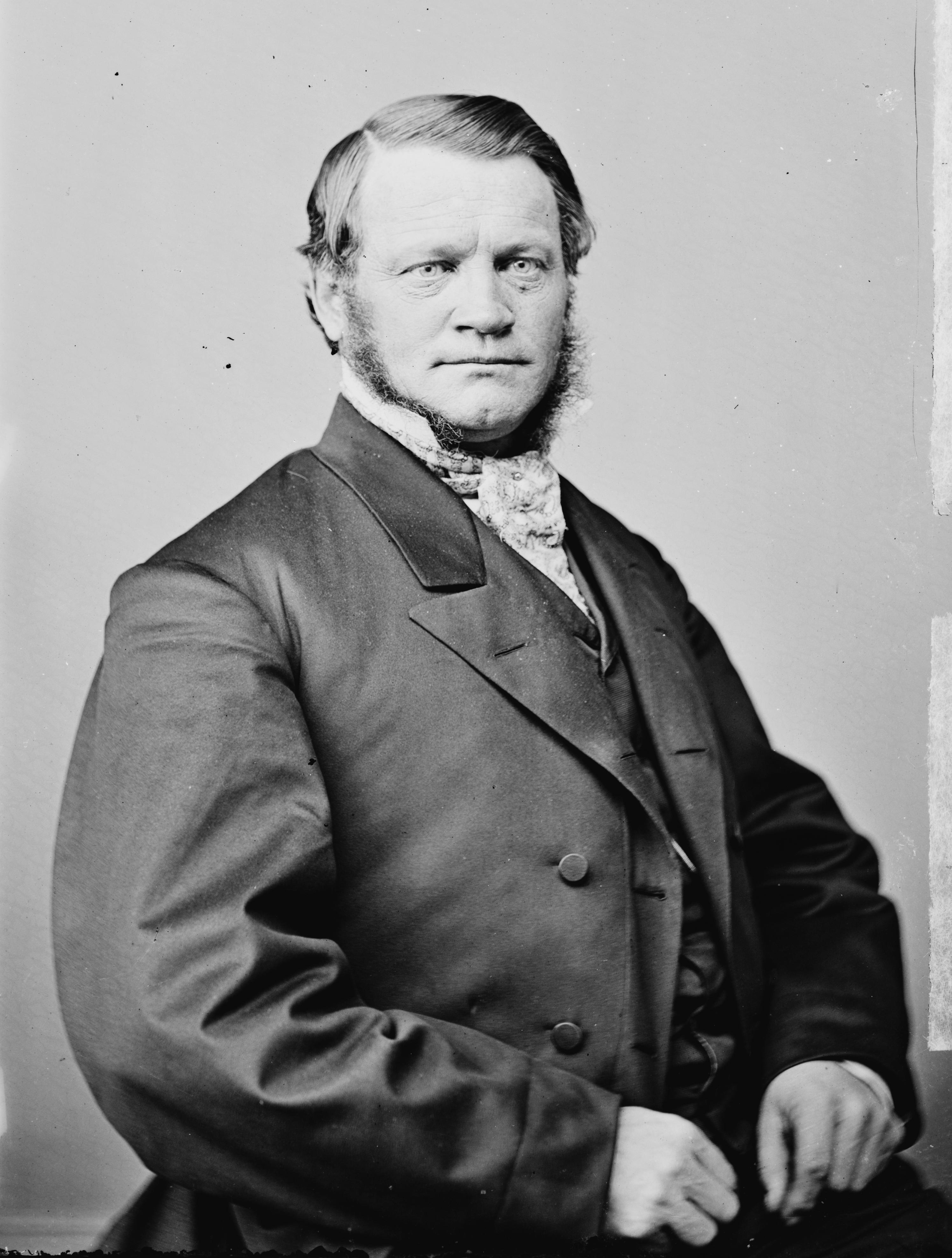
Josiah Bushnell Grinnell: one of the four founders of Grinnell, Iowa, and benefactor of Grinnell College

In its early years, the college experienced setbacks. Although two students received Bachelor of Arts degrees in 1854 (the first to be granted by a college west of the Mississippi River), within 10 years the Civil War had claimed most of Grinnell's students and professors. In the decade following the war, growth resumed: women were officially admitted as candidates for degrees, and the curriculum was enlarged to include then-new areas of academic studies, such as natural sciences with laboratory work.

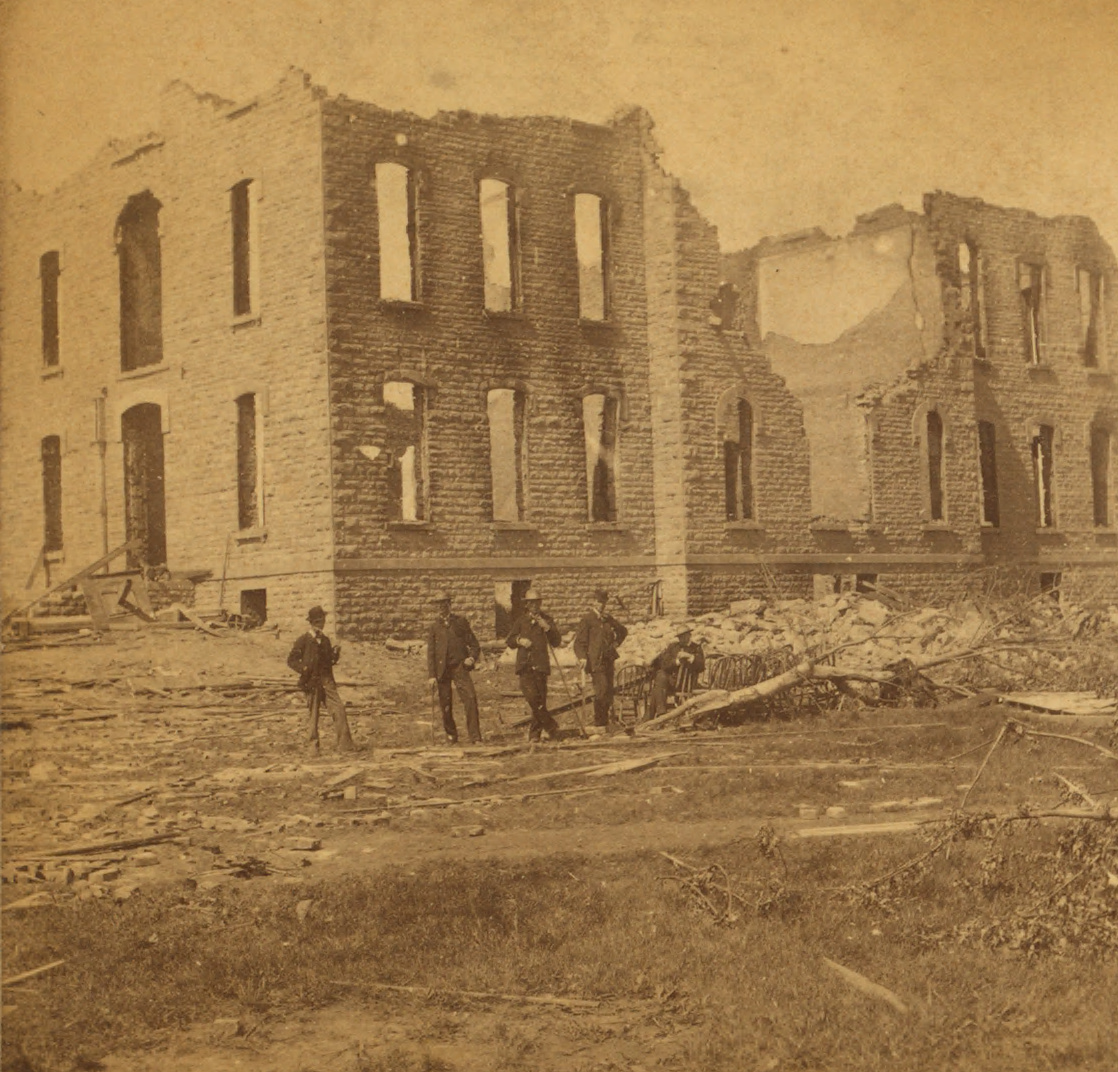
After the June 17, 1882 tornado

In 1879, the first African American graduated from Grinnell College. Hannibal Kershaw became a teacher, minister, and a South Carolina legislator. Kershaw unfortunately died in 1883, only four years after his graduation. A residence hall was named in his honor in 2005. Kershaw Hall is a white limestone building on East Campus.

In 1882, Grinnell College was struck by a tornado—then called a cyclone, after which the college yearbook was named. The storm devastated the campus and destroyed both college buildings. Rebuilding began immediately, and the determination to expand was not limited to architecture: the curriculum was again extended to include departments in political science (one of the first in the United States—the University of Minnesota's department was founded in 1879, three years earlier) and modern languages.

Grinnell became known as the center of the Social Gospel reform movement, as Robert Handy writes, "The movement centered on the campus of Iowa (now Grinnell) College. Its leading figures were Professor George D. Herron and President George A. Gates". Other firsts pointed to the lighter side of college life: the first intercollegiate football and baseball games west of the Mississippi were played in Grinnell, and the home teams won.

As the 20th century began, Grinnell established a Phi Beta Kappa chapter, introduced the departmental "major" system of study, began Grinnell-in-China (an educational mission that lasted until the Japanese invasion and resumed in 1987), and built a women's residence hall system that became a national model. The social consciousness fostered at Grinnell during these years became evident during Franklin D. Roosevelt's presidency, when Grinnell graduates Harry Hopkins '12, Chester Davis '11, Paul Appleby '13, Hallie Flanagan '11, and Florence Kerr '12 became influential New Deal administrators. Concern with social issues, educational innovation, and individual expression continue to shape Grinnell. As an example, the school's "5th year travel-service program", preceded the establishment of the Peace Corps by many years. Other recent innovations include first-year tutorials, cooperative pre-professional programs, and programs in quantitative studies and the societal impacts of technology. Every year, the college awards the $100,000 Grinnell College Innovator for Social Justice Prize, which is split between the recipient and their organization.

In 1937, the first African-American woman graduated from Grinnell College. Mrs. Edith Renfrow Smith majored in psychology and minored in sociology and economics. Following graduation, Renfrow moved to Chicago and worked at the YWCA, the University of Chicago and then as a public schoolteacher in Chicago for over twenty years. In 2024, Grinnell College honored Renfrow Smith by naming and dedicating a residence building, which includes the Civic Engagement Quad (CEQ), as Renfrow Hall.

In 1975, Grinnell College through their Grinnell Communications subsidiary purchased NBC affiliate WLWD from Avco Broadcasting Corporation for about $13 million. The station changed its call letters to WDTN once the sale closed. Shortly after WDTN became an ABC affiliate, the station was sold off to Hearst Broadcasting for $45–$48 million.

In 2022, Grinnell became the first fully unionized undergraduate school in the U.S., when student workers voted to expand their dining hall workers union to include all student workers. The move was supported by the president of the college.

== Campus ==
Grinnell College is located in the town of Grinnell, Iowa, about halfway between Des Moines and Iowa City. The main campus, which was once a stop on the Underground Railroad, is bounded by 6th Avenue on the south, 10th Avenue on the north, East Street on the east and Park Street on the west. The 120-acre (0.49 km^{2}) campus contains sixty-three buildings ranging in style from Collegiate Gothic to Bauhaus to Tudor to Modernist. Goodnow Hall and Mears Cottage (1889) are listed on the National Register of Historic Places. Immediately west of the college is the North Grinnell Historic District, which contains over 200 National Register of Historic Places contributing buildings.

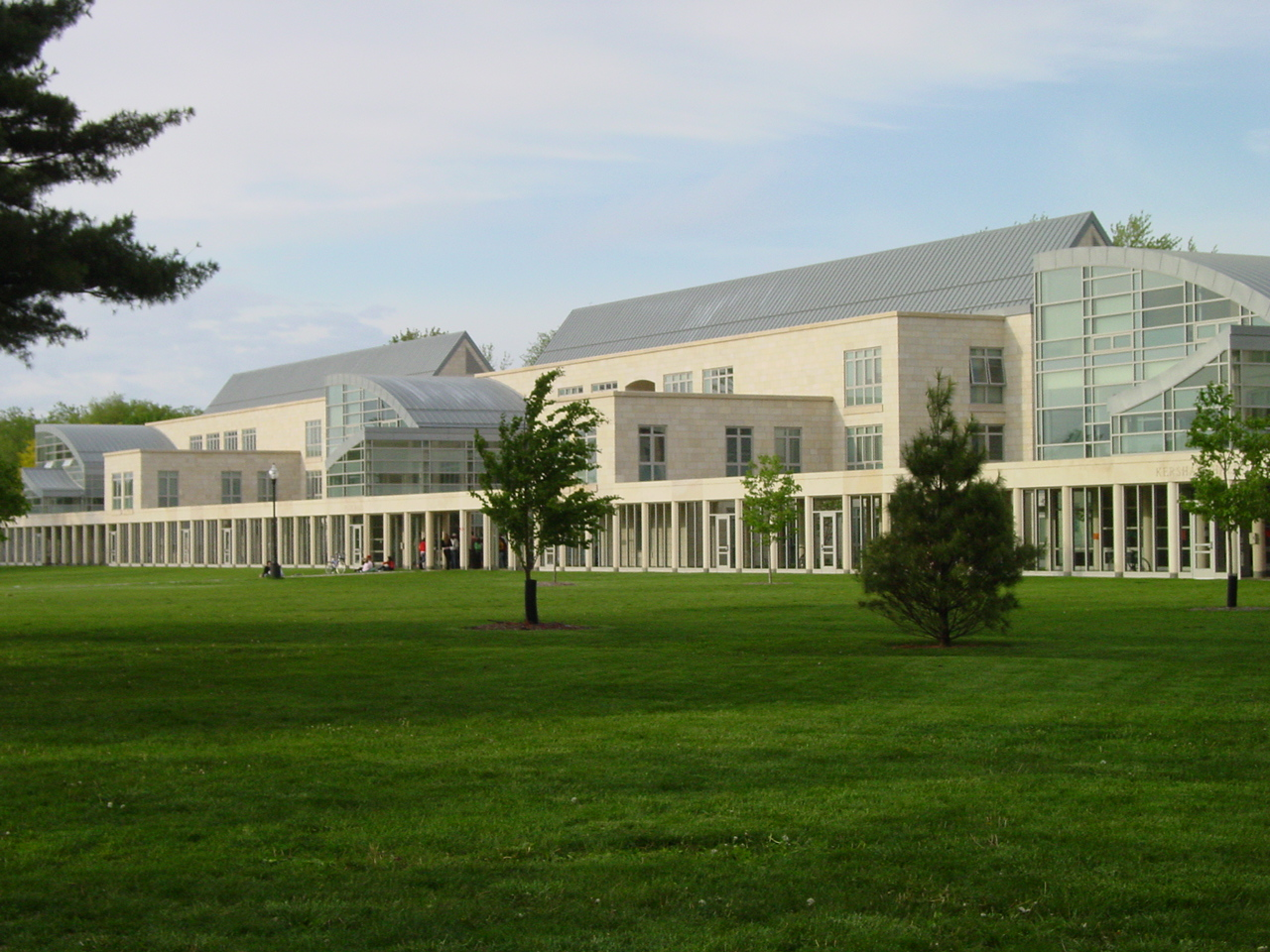
East Campus dormitories connected by Grinnell's distinctive loggia

The residential part of campus is divided into three sections: North Campus, East Campus, and South Campus. North and South Campus' dormitories are modeled explicitly after the residential colleges of Oxford and Cambridge. The four East Campus dormitories feature a modern, LEED-certified design constructed from Iowa limestone.

All three campuses feature dormitory buildings connected by loggia, an architectural signature of the college. The loggia on South Campus is the only entirely closed loggia, while the loggias on East and North campus are only partially closed. From the time that the first dorm opened in 1915 until the fall of 1968, the nine north campus dorms were used exclusively for male students, and the six south campus dorms reserved for female students. The dorm halls house significantly fewer students than halls at other colleges.

Most academic buildings are located on the southwestern quarter of campus. The athletic facilities are mostly located north of 10th Avenue.

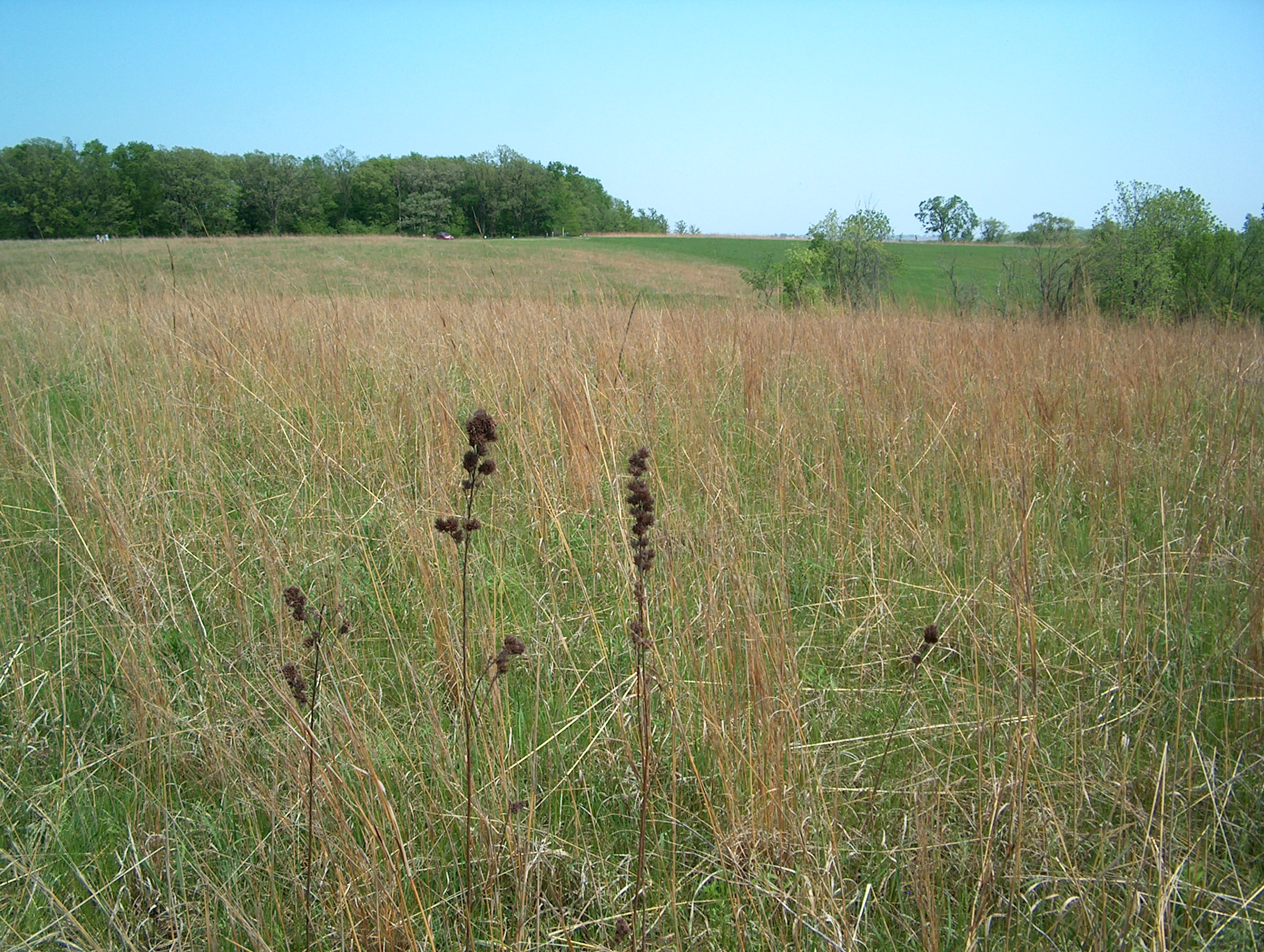
Prairie ecosystem of the Conard Environmental Research Area

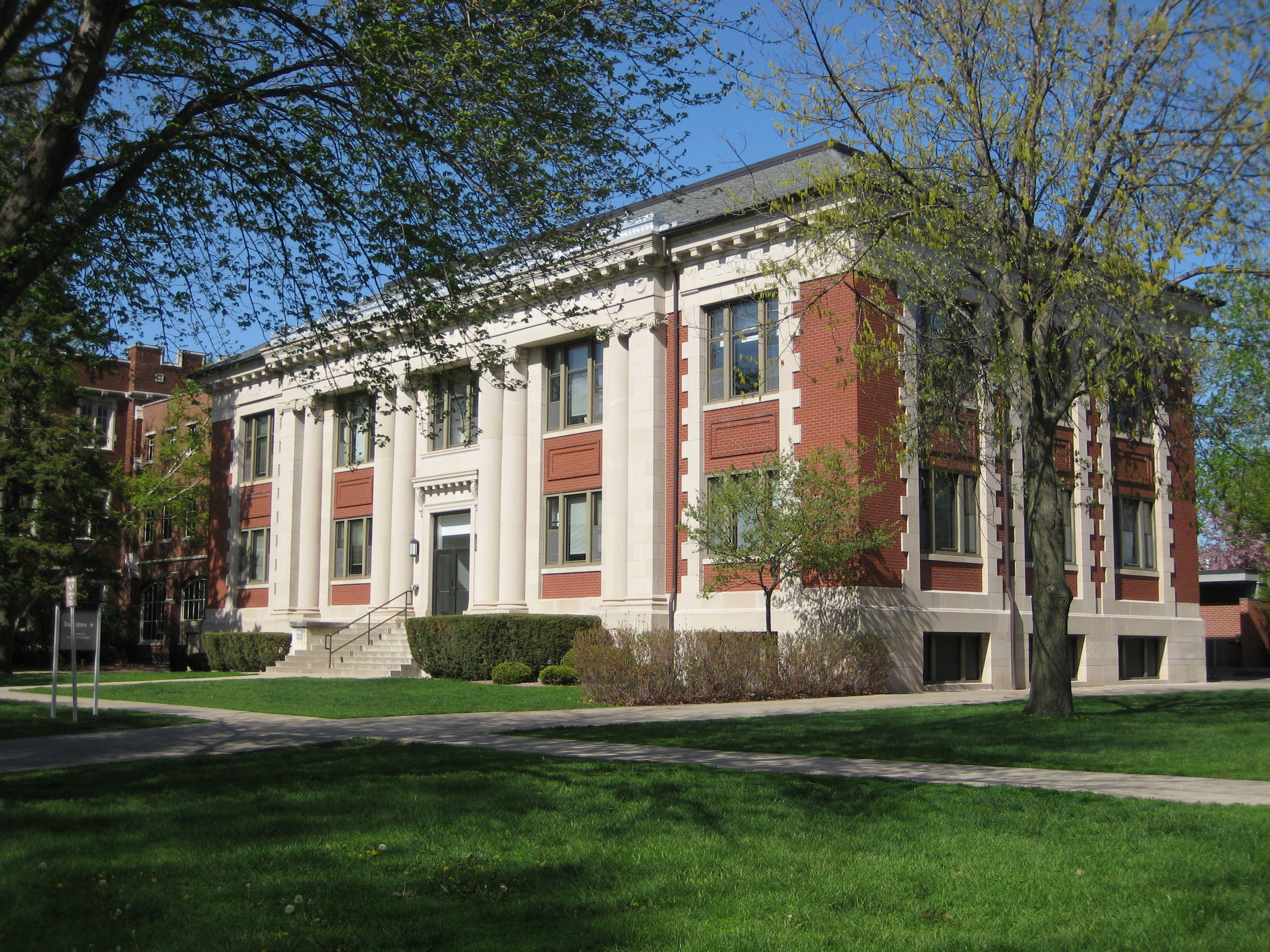
Carnegie Hall, an academic building used by the humanities and social sciences divisions

The college maintains a 365-acre (1.48 km^{2}) environmental research area called the Conard Environmental Research Area (CERA). The U.S. Green Building Council awarded CERA's Environmental Education Center a gold certification. The building is the first in Iowa to receive the designation.

During the 2000s, the college completed the Charles Benson Bear '39 Recreation and Athletic Center, the Bucksbaum Center for the Arts, the renovation of the Robert Noyce '49 Science Center and the Joe Rosenfield '25 Student Center. Internationally renowned architect César Pelli designed the athletics center, the Joe Rosenfield '25 Student Center, and the Bucksbaum Center for the Arts.

The college is going through a period of new construction which is expected to last until 2034.

== Academics ==
Grinnell's open curriculum encourages students to take initiative and to assume responsibility for choosing their own courses of study. The sole core, or general education, requirement is the completion of the First-Year Tutorial, a one-semester, four-credit special topics seminar that stresses methods of inquiry, critical analysis, and writing skills. All other classes are chosen, with the direct guidance of a faculty member in the student's major department, by the student.

Grinnell's three most popular majors among 2021 graduates were Computer Science, Biology/Biological Sciences, and Research & Experimental Psychology.

=== Graduate programs ===
Although the college does not offer any graduate degrees, it does have dual degree programs with several universities that let Grinnell students move directly into graduate programs. Grinnell participates in a 3–2 engineering dual degree program with Columbia University, Washington University in St. Louis, Rensselaer Polytechnic Institute, and California Institute of Technology. It also has a 2–1–1–1 engineering program with Dartmouth College and a Master of Public Health cooperative degree program with University of Iowa.

=== Reputation ===
Academic rankings

Liberal arts
- U.S. News & World Report: 13 (tie); LACs
- Washington Monthly: 25; LACs

National
- Forbes: 116 (all colleges)
- WSJ/College Pulse: 266 (all colleges)

Grinnell College has been listed in each edition of Howard & Matthew Greene's guides The Hidden Ivies.

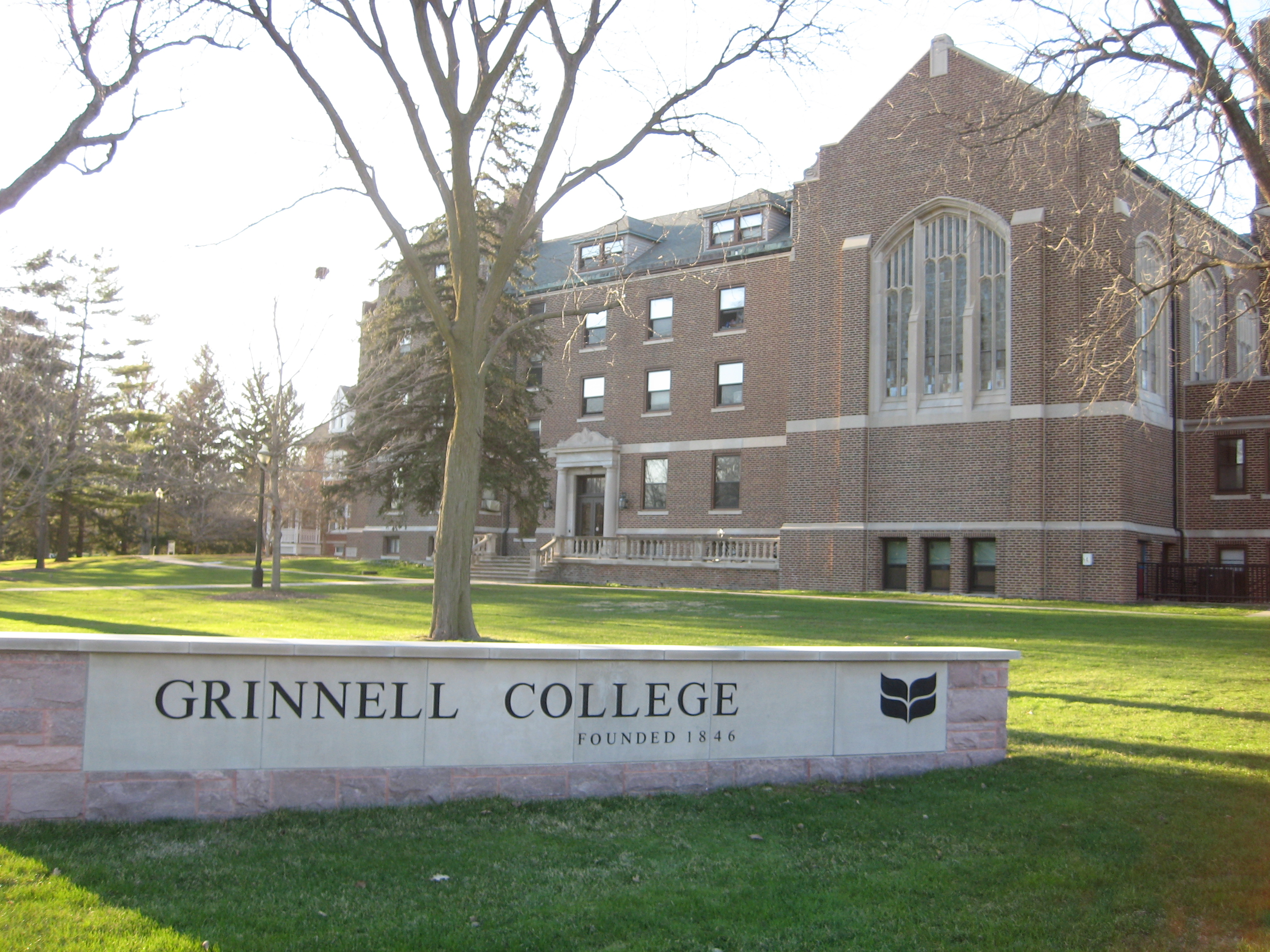
John H. T. Main Residence Hall

The 2025-26 annual ranking of U.S. News & World Report rates it tied for the 13th best liberal arts college overall in the U.S., 3rd for "Best Undergraduate Teaching, 8th for "Best Value", and 13th for "Most Innovative".The Princeton Review ranks Grinnell as 10th in Best Classroom Experience. Grinnell is ranked 5th in the 2021 Washington Monthly rankings for liberal arts colleges, which focus on key outputs such as research, dollar value of scientific grants won, the number of graduates going on to earn Ph.D. degrees, and certain types of public service. Kiplinger's Personal Finance ranked Grinnell 14th in its 2019 ranking of "best value" liberal arts colleges in the United States. In Forbes magazine's 2015 rankings of academic institutions, "America's Top Colleges" (which uses a non-traditional ranking system based on RateMyProfessors.com evaluations, notable alumni, student debt, percentage of students graduating in four years, and the number of students or faculty receiving prestigious awards), Grinnell College was ranked 81st among all colleges and universities, 21st among liberal arts colleges, and 10th in the Midwest.

=== Faculty ===
Grinnell had 173 full-time faculty in fall 2020, all of whom possess a doctorate or the terminal degree in their field. In 2026, U.S. News & World Report ranked Grinnell #3 in Best Undergraduate Teaching.

=== Admission ===
Admissions statistics
- 2022 entering class
- Admit rate: 10.76% (▼ −18.11)
- Yield rate: 40.61% (▲ +14.15)

Test scores middle 50%^{[i]}
- SAT Total: 1410–1520 (among 28% of FTFs)
- ACT Composite: 31–34 (among 27% of FTFs)

High school GPA^{[ii]}
- Top 10%: 66% (▼ −3)
- Top 25%: 90% (▼ −1)
- Top 50%: 98% (▼ −1)

In 2019, U.S. News & World Report classified Grinnell's selectivity as "most selective". For Fall 2022, Grinnell received 9,997 freshmen applications; 1,076 were admitted (10.76%). During the 2020-2021 application season, Grinnell offered a standardized test-optional application, due to limited testing access caused by the global COVID-19 pandemic.

Grinnell College's admission selectivity rating, according to The Princeton Review in 2025-26, is a 97 out of 99. This rating is determined by several institutionally reported factors, including: the class rank, average standardized test scores, and average high school GPA of entering freshmen; the percentage of students who hail from out-of-state; and the percentage of applicants accepted.

=== Graduation rates ===
Grinnell College is oriented towards students being enrolled full-time in exactly eight consecutive semesters at the college, although exceptions are available for medical issues and other emergencies. To avoid being suspended from the college, students must make "normal progress towards graduation". This generally means that the student must pass at least 12 credits of classes in each individual semester, with grades C or higher, and have accumulated enough credits to make graduation possible at the end of four years, which requires an average of 15.5 credits each semester. A student who is not making normal progress towards graduation is placed on academic probation and may be dismissed from the college.

Nationwide, only 20% of college students complete a four-year undergraduate degree within four years, and only 57% of college students graduate within six years. However, at Grinnell College, 84% of students graduate within four years. This is the highest graduation rate of any college in Iowa.

== Tuition and financial aid ==
The sticker price for Grinnell's combined tuition, room, board, and fees for the 2022–2023 academic year is $76,528. Tuition and fees are $61,480 and room and board are $15,048.

=== Need-blind admissions and full financial aid ===
Grinnell College is one of a few dozen US colleges that maintain need-blind admissions and meets the full demonstrated financial need of all U.S. residents who are admitted to the college. Grinnell offers a large amount of need-based and merit-based aid in comparison with peer institutions. Currently (2020–21), 86% of students receive some form of financial aid. In 2018–2019, 20% of students enrolled at Grinnell College were receiving federal Pell Grants, which are generally reserved for students from low-income families. The average financial aid package is over $51,770. Grinnell guarantees a $10,000 Grinnell Choice Scholarship renewable for eight semesters to all U.S. citizens and permanent residents admitted under the Early Decision program.

Beginning with the first-year students enrolled in the 2006–2007 school year, Grinnell ended its need-blind admissions policy for international applicants. Under the old policy, students from countries outside the U.S. were admitted without any consideration of their ability to afford four years of study at the college. However, financial aid offers to these students were limited to half the cost of tuition. International students frequently carried very high workloads in an effort to pay the bills, and their academic performance often suffered. Under the new "need-sensitive" or "need-aware" policy, international students whose demonstrated financial needs can be met are given a slight admissions edge over applicants who cannot. The twin hopes are that the enrolled international students will be able to dedicate more energy to their schoolwork, and also that this will ultimately allow the college to provide higher tuition grants to international students.

=== Paid internships ===
In addition to financial aid, students receive funding from the college for unpaid or underpaid summer internships and professional development (including international conferences and professional attire).

== Student body ==
In a 2014 study, compared to other US colleges with high four-year graduation rates, the economic diversity of students at Grinnell College was second only to Vassar College, indicating that it is accessible to students from low-income and middle-income families.

Grinnell is unusual for a selective school based in a small town for being able to attract a relatively large number of international students and US students of color. About a quarter of students are people of color. Most students come from outside the Midwestern United States, and less than 10% are from Iowa.

== Athletics ==
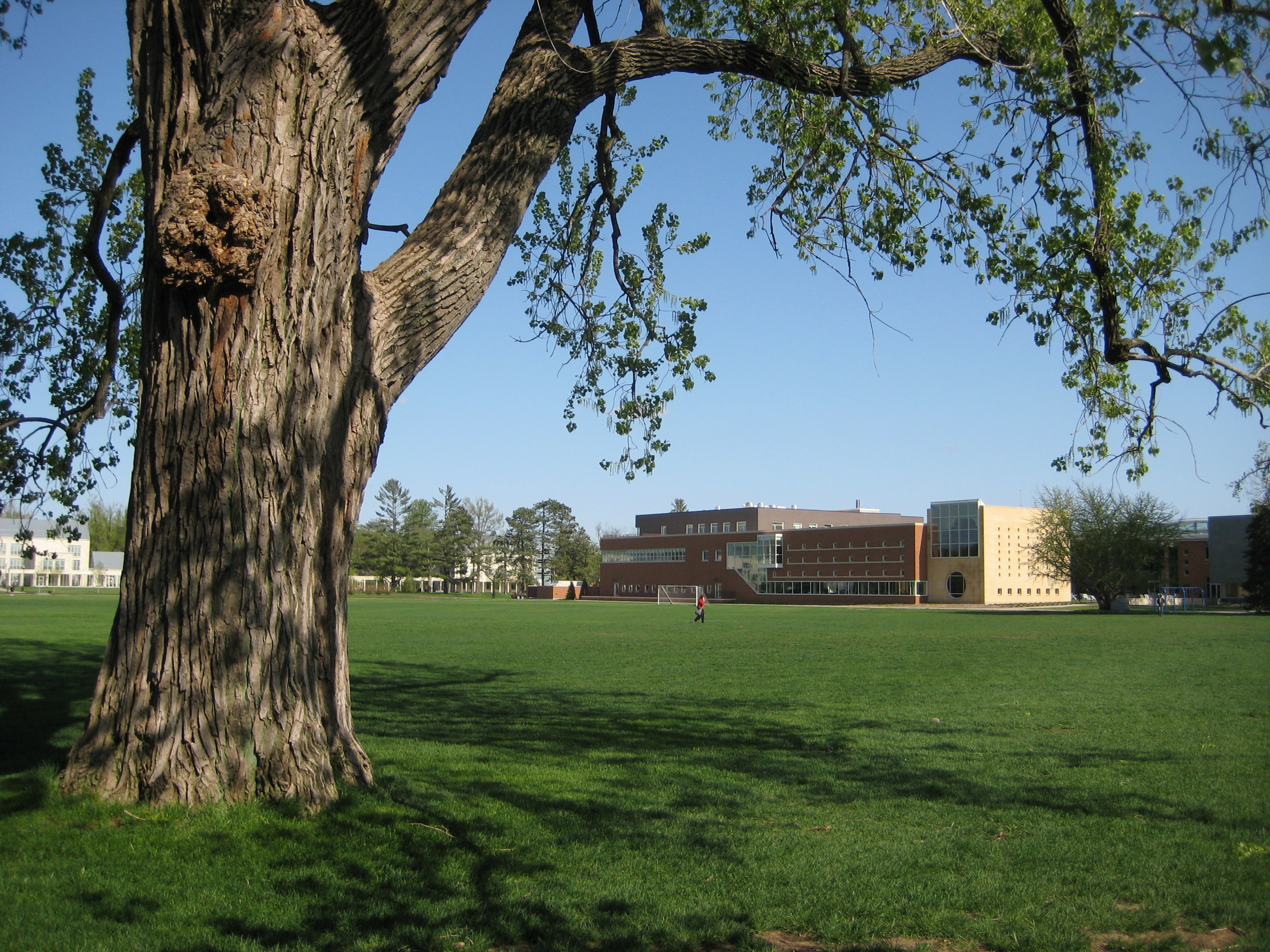
Grinnell College MacEachron Field

The school's varsity sports teams are named the Pioneers. They participate in eighteen intercollegiate sports at the NCAA Division III level and in the Midwest Conference. In addition, Grinnell has several club sports teams that compete in non-varsity sports such as volleyball, sailing, water polo, ultimate and rugby union.

Nearly one-third of recent Grinnell graduates participated in at least one of varsity sports while attending the college and the college has led the Midwest Conference in the total number of Academic All-Conference honorees in last four years (as of 2021).

The Grinnell Pioneers won the first game of intercollegiate football west of the Mississippi when they beat the University of Iowa 24–0 on November 16, 1889. A marker on Abe H. Rosenbloom Field, where Grinnell College's football team now plays, commemorates this victory.

The men's water polo team, known as the Wild Turkeys, were runners-up in the 2007 College Water Polo Association (CWPA) Division III Collegiate National Club Championships hosted by Lindenwood University in St. Charles, Missouri. They also qualified for the tournament in 2008, 2009, 2011, 2013, and 2014. The Men's Ultimate team, nicknamed the Grinnellephants, qualified in 2008 for its first Division III National Championship in Versailles, Ohio. The Women's Ultimate team, nicknamed The Sticky Tongue Frogs, tied for third place in the 2010 Division III National Championship in Appleton, Wisconsin. The success was repeated in 2011 when the men's team placed third in 2011 Division III National Championship in Buffalo.

In February 2005, the Grinnell Pioneers men's basketball team became the first Division III school featured in a regular season basketball game by the ESPN network family in 30 years when it faced off against the Beloit Buccaneers on ESPN2. Grinnell lost 86–85. Grinnell College's basketball team attracted ESPN due to the team's run and gun style of playing basketball, known in Grinnell simply as "The System". Coach Dave Arseneault originated the Grinnell System that incorporates a continual full-court press, a fast-paced offense, an emphasis on offensive rebounding, a barrage of three-point shots and substitutions of five players at a time every 35 to 40 seconds. This allows a higher average playing time for more players than the "starters" and suits the Division III goals of scholar-athletes. "The System" has been criticized for not teaching the principles of defense. However, under "The System", Grinnell has won three conference championships over the past ten years and have regularly placed in the top half of the conference. Coach Arseneault's teams have set numerous NCAA scoring records and several individuals on the Grinnell team have led the nation in scoring or assists.

On November 19, 2011, Grinnell player Griffin Lentsch set a new Division III individual scoring record in a game against Principia College. The 6-foot-4-inch (1.93 m) guard scored 89 points, besting the old record of 77, also set by a Pioneers player—Jeff Clement—in 1998. Lentsch made 27 of his 55 shots, including 15 three-pointers as Grinnell won the high-scoring game 145 to 97. On November 20, 2012, Grinnell's Jack Taylor broke Lentsch's scoring record, as well as the records for NCAA and collegiate scoring, in a 179–104 victory over Faith Baptist Bible College. Taylor scored 138 points on 108 shots, along with 3 rebounds, 6 turnovers and 3 steals. Taylor went 27 for 71 from behind the arc. Taylor scored 109 points in a November 2013 game against Crossroads College to become the first player in NCAA history to have two 100-point games.

In 2019, the Grinnell women's volleyball team advanced to the NCAA Division III National Tournament for the first time in the 46-year history of the program, defeating St. Norbert College in a five-set thriller during the Midwest Conference Tournament championship match at Cornell College's gymnasium. It also marked Grinnell's first-ever MWC Tournament title in volleyball.

== Social activities and organizations ==
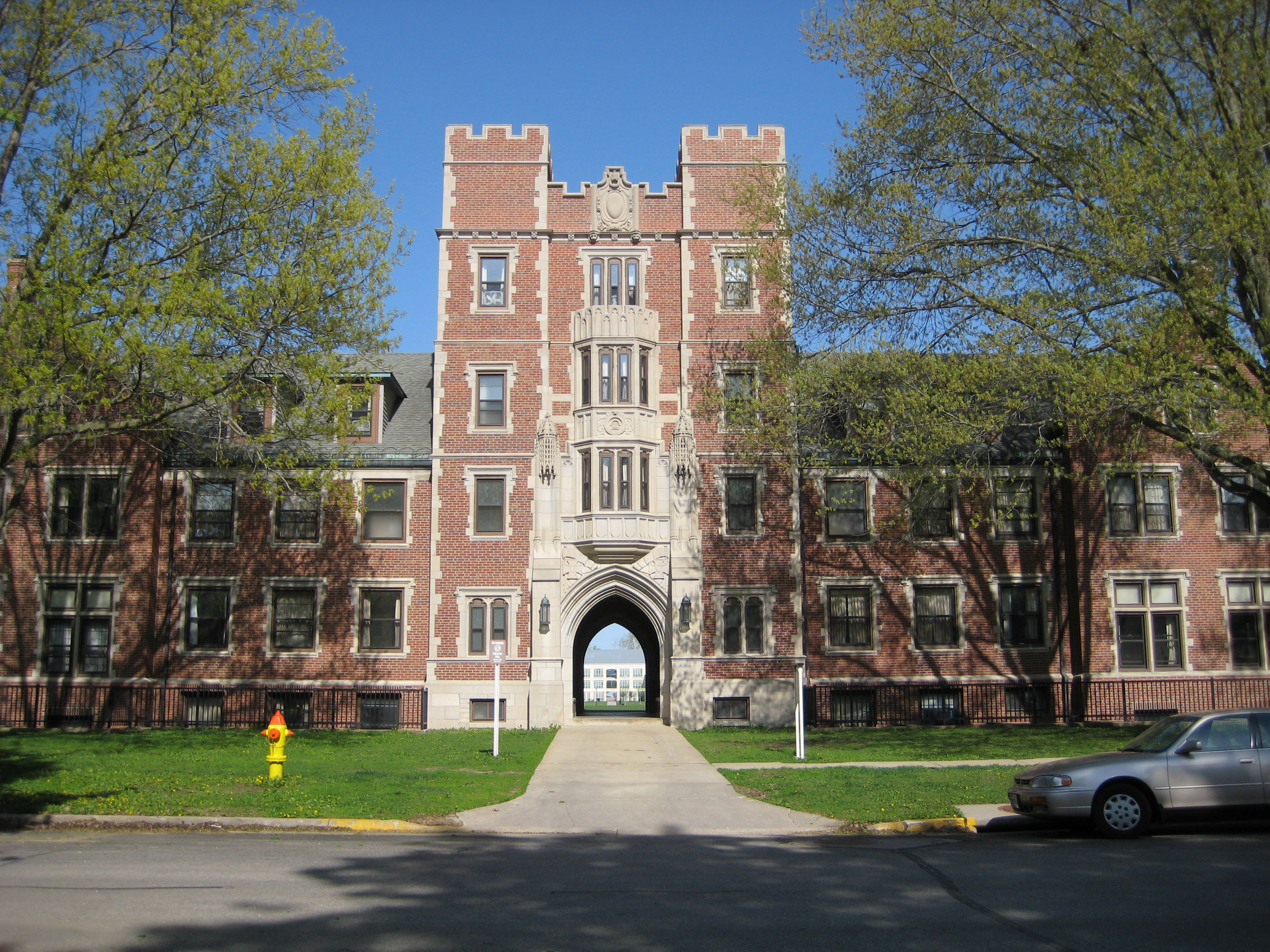
Gates Tower and Rawson Hall

Students at Grinnell adhere to an honor system known as "self-governance" wherein they are expected to govern their own choices and behavior with minimal direct intervention by the college administration. By cultivating a community based on freedom of choice, self-governance aims to encourage students to become responsible, respectful, and accountable members of the campus, town, and global community.

Founded in November 2000, the student-run group Pioneer Capital Investments (PCI), formerly known as Student Endowment Investing Group, actively invests over $100,000 of Grinnell College's endowment capital in public equities. The group's mission is to provide interested students with valuable experience for future careers in finance. Two environmental organizations on campus produce and sell custom notebooks, using leftover paper from classwork and reused pasteboard from boxes originally holding breakfast cereal or other products.

Service organizations are popular. The Alternative Break ("AltBreak") program takes students to pursue service initiatives during school holidays, and as of 2005, Grinnell had more alumni per capita serving in the Peace Corps than any other college in the nation. The college also runs its own post-graduation service program known as Grinnell Corps in Grinnell, China, Namibia, New Orleans, and Thailand, and has previously operated programs in Greece, Lesotho, Macau, and Nepal.

=== Union of Grinnell Student Dining Workers ===
In 2016, students formed the Union of Grinnell Student Dining Workers, or UGSDW, to represent student workers in the college's dining hall. It was the first undergraduate student workers union at a private college in the United States. After several years of legal maneuvers, the USGDW and the college agreed that the college would be neutral in elections and abide by the results.

In April 2022, members of the UGSDW voted 327–6 to expand the union to all hourly paid student workers on campus, which made Grinnell the first and only fully unionized student-worker body in the country. In October 2022, the union and the college began the collective bargaining process.

== Notable alumni ==
Notable alumni include:

- Emily Bergl, 1997, actress and singer
- Thomas Cech, 1970, co-winner of 1989 Nobel Prize in Chemistry, president of Howard Hughes Medical Institute
- Florin Cîțu, 1996, Prime Minister of Romania (2020–2021)
- Mary Sue Coleman, 1965, president of the University of Iowa and the University of Michigan
- Gary Cooper, 1922, actor, best known for High Noon
- Peter Coyote, 1964, actor, author, director, screenwriter and narrator of films, theatre, television and audiobooks. He is known for his work in various films such as E.T. the Extra-Terrestrial (1982) and Erin Brockovich (2000)
- John Garang, 1969, founder of the Sudan People's Liberation Movement and former Vice President of Sudan
- Herbie Hancock, 1960, jazz musician and composer
- Harry Hopkins, 1912, American statesman, public administrator, and presidential advisor
- Paul McCulley, 1979, American economist and former managing director at PIMCO.
- Kumail Nanjiani, 2001, comedian, actor, screenwriter and podcaster, best known for his role as Dinesh on HBO's comedy series Silicon Valley, and for co-writing and starring in the romantic comedy The Big Sick
- Robert Noyce, 1949, co-founder of Intel, co-inventor of the integrated circuit, National Medal of Science recipient
- Clair Cameron Patterson, 1943, American geochemist
- Chase Strangio, 2004, lawyer and transgender rights activist
- Henry Travillion Wingate, 1969, United States district judge
