= London Calling (play) =

1930 comedy play by Geoffrey Kerr

- Little Theatre playbill
- Original language: English
- Written by: Geoffrey Kerr
- Characters: Straight; Mary Dayton; Anne Hunter; Jenny Fall; George Craft; Willie Craft; Carl Merodini; Mrs. Craft; Chauncey Knayling; Blewes; Henry Dayton
- Genre: Comedy
- Setting: Manhattan

Premiere
- Date: October 18, 1930
- Place: Little Theatre, Rochester, New York

London Calling is a comedy play in three acts, written by Geoffrey Kerr, produced by John Golden, and directed by Dan Jarratt. The play was first performed at Little Theatre, Rochester, New York, on October 18, 1930. The star of the original production was British-born thespian St. Clair Bayfield. Geoffrey Kerr had previously performed in The Stork (1925) and also wrote short stories on the side for Vanity Fair magazine.

== Plot ==
The comedy centres on two brothers Willie and George Craft, whose American mother and British father long have been divorced. Willie Craft has been raised in America by his mother, George by his father in London, England. When George appears for a surprise visit to Manhattan, he and Willie soon fall for a designing woman, Anne Hunter. Their mother decides she is not suitable and prevents her from seeing them, and in the process tries reconciling with their father.

== Scene synopsis ==
Mrs. Craft's apartment on Park Avenue and George Craft's furnished apartment on East 49th Street.

== Original production ==
=== Cast and characters ===
- St. Clair Bayfield - Straight
- Emma Bunting - Mary Dayton
- Helen Flint - Anne Hunter
- Penelope Hubbard - Jenny Fall
- Geoffrey Kerr - George Craft
- Charles Lawrence - Willie Craft
- Edward Leiter - Carl Merodini
- Anne Sutherland - Mrs. Craft
- Graham Velsey - Chauncey Knayling
- Dallas Welford - Blewes
- Walter Wilson - Henry Dayton
