= Highlandtown, Ohio =

- Unincorporated community
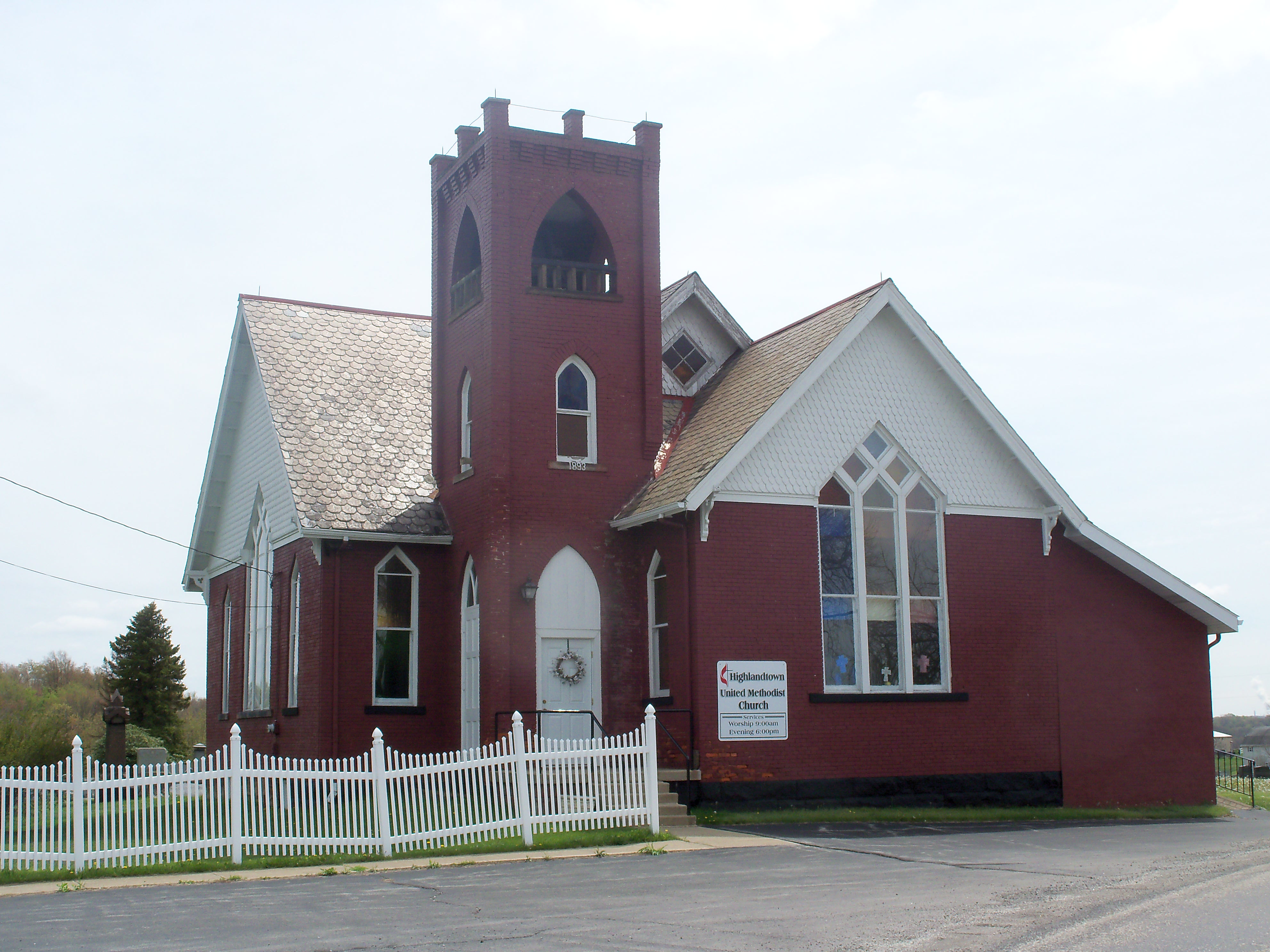
- Highlandtown United Methodist Church

- Location within Ohio Location within the United States
- Coordinates: 40°38′03″N 80°45′24″W
- Country: United States
- State: Ohio
- County: Columbiana
- Township: Washington
- Elevation: 1,188 ft (362 m)
- Time zone: UTC-5 (Eastern (EST))
  - Summer (DST): UTC-4 (EDT)
- GNIS feature ID: 1041567

Highlandtown is an unincorporated community in eastern Washington Township, Columbiana County, Ohio, United States. It is immediately south of Highlandtown Lake, a reservoir which takes its name.

Highlandtown was originally built up chiefly by settlers of Scottish ancestry. The name Highlandtown is derived from the Scottish Highlands. The post office at Highlandtown was called Inverness, as there was already a Highlandtown post office at the time. The Inverness post office was established in 1838, and remained in operation until 1902, and the community reverted to Highlandtown.
