= Highlandtown Lake =

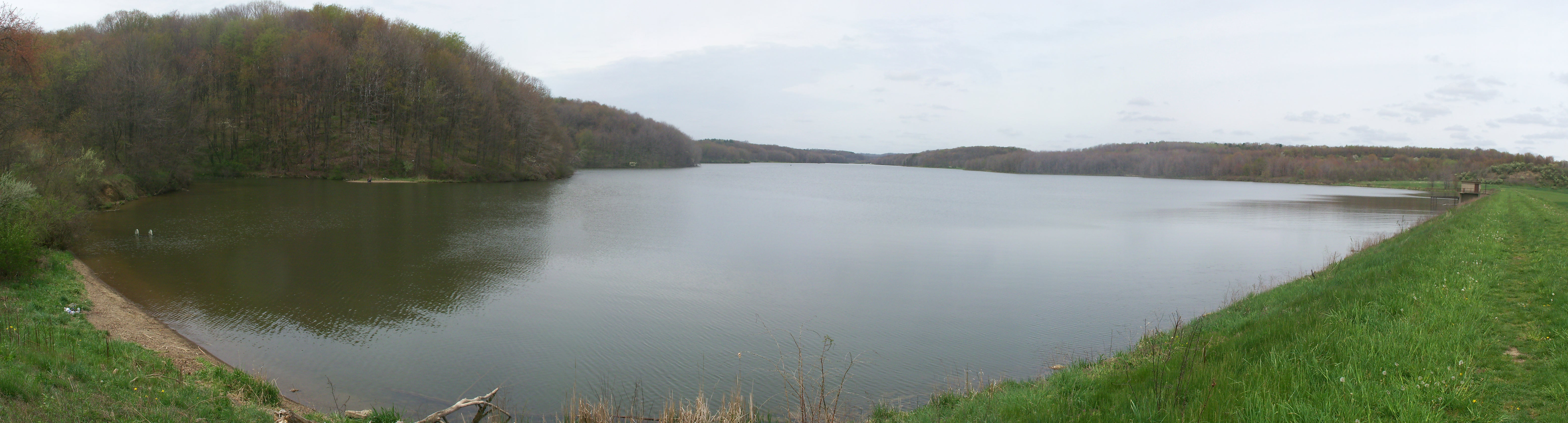
- Panorama view from south end of dam

- Location within Ohio Location within the United States
- Location: Washington Township, Columbiana County, Ohio
- Coordinates: 40°38′31″N 80°45′32″W
- Type: Reservoir
- Basin countries: United States
- Built: 1966
- Surface area: 170 acres (0.69 km^{2})
- Max. depth: 26 ft (7.9 m)
- Water volume: 5,710 acre⋅ft (0.00704 km^{3})
- Surface elevation: 1,073 feet (327 m)

Highlandtown Lake is a man-made lake located in Washington Township, Columbiana County, Ohio. It was created in 1966 when the State of Ohio built a dam impounding 170 acres (0.69 km^{2}) of water on the upper drainage of the Little Yellow Creek. A lot of habitat improvement was done on what would be the bottom of the lake prior to the impoundment. It has about 5 miles (8.0 km) of shoreline and a maximum depth of about 26 feet (7.9 m). The lake is about 1,100 feet (340 m) above sea level.

The dam is of earthen construction, rock fill. Its height is 44 feet (13 m) with a length of 1,476 feet (450 m). Maximum discharge is 4,196 cubic feet per second (118.8 m^{3}/s). Its capacity is 5,710 acre-feet (0.00704 km^{3}). Normal storage is 2,700 acre-feet (0.0033 km^{3}). It drains an area of 5.8 square miles (15 km^{2}).

== Location ==
It is in the Wildlife District Three of the Ohio Division of Wildlife. It is part of the 2,265 acres (9.17 km^{2}) Highlandtown Wildlife Area. It is within a mile of an area known as Highlandtown. It is four miles northeast of Salineville via State Route 39 and nine miles south of Lisbon via State Route 164. It is 11 miles northwest of Wellsville via State Route 39. A portion of the Steubenville Pike Road (Township Road 776) was covered by the lake and it now dead ends at the lake. Osborne Road crosses the northwest arm of the lake. Charles Mill Road (County Highway 413) crosses the northern arm of the lake.

== Geography ==
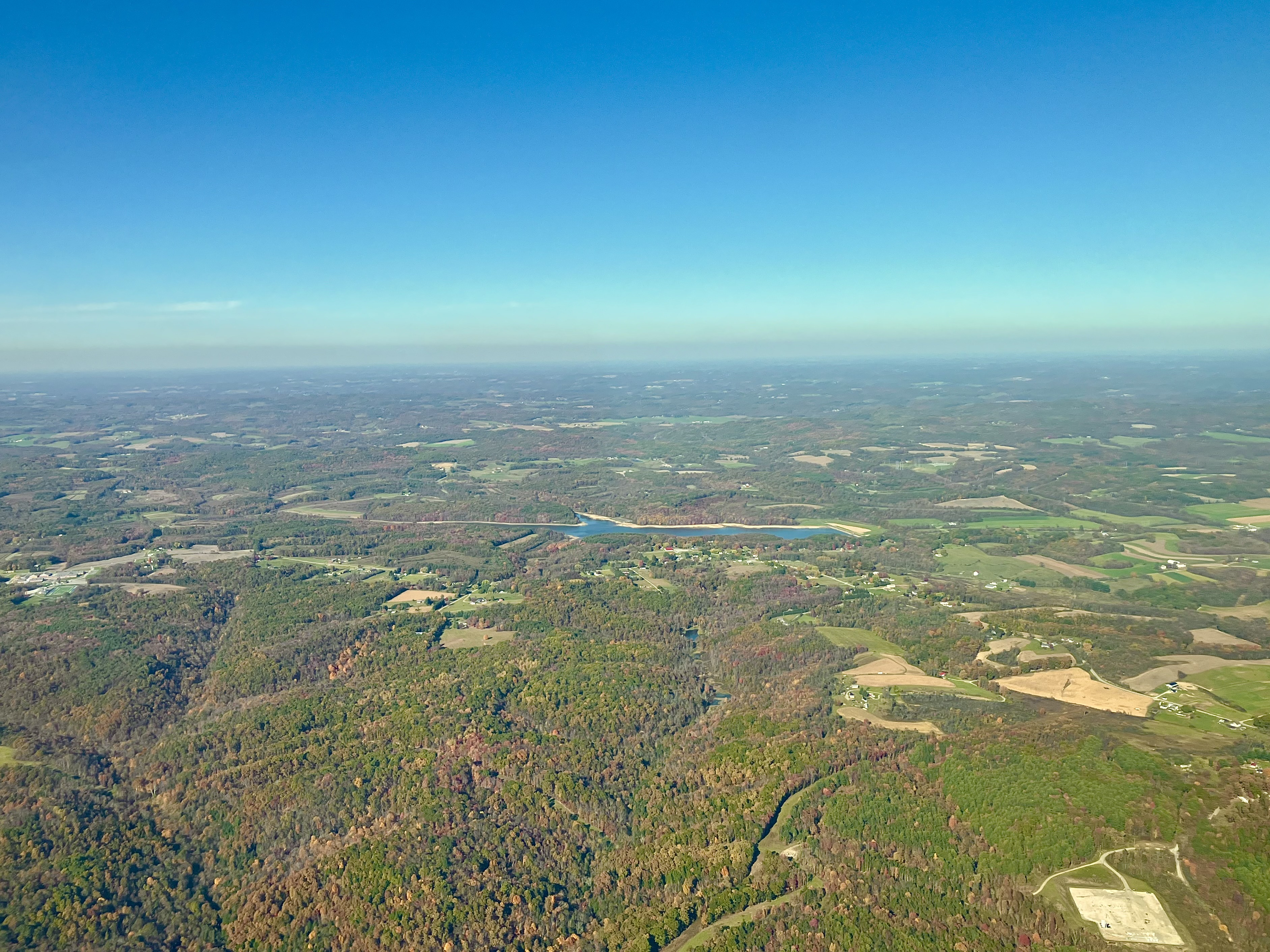
Reservoir from the air

The area is an Appalachian mixed mesophytic forest. The lake is at the headwaters of Little Yellow Creek.

== Fish ==
The lake was stocked in 1967 with muskellunge, largemouth bass, bluegill, and channel catfish. At present there are also black crappie, brown bullheads, pumpkinseeds and other varieties of sunfish. In about 2000 American gizzard shad appeared in the lake. Because of feeding patterns this resulted in bass getting bigger and bluegills getting smaller. White amurs (grass carp) have been introduced to control weeds and they have remove weed beds which were good places to fish for bass.

== Facilities ==
There is parking, boat ramps, and a handicap dock for fishing. There is no camping in the wildlife area.
