= Bevo Francis =

American basketball player

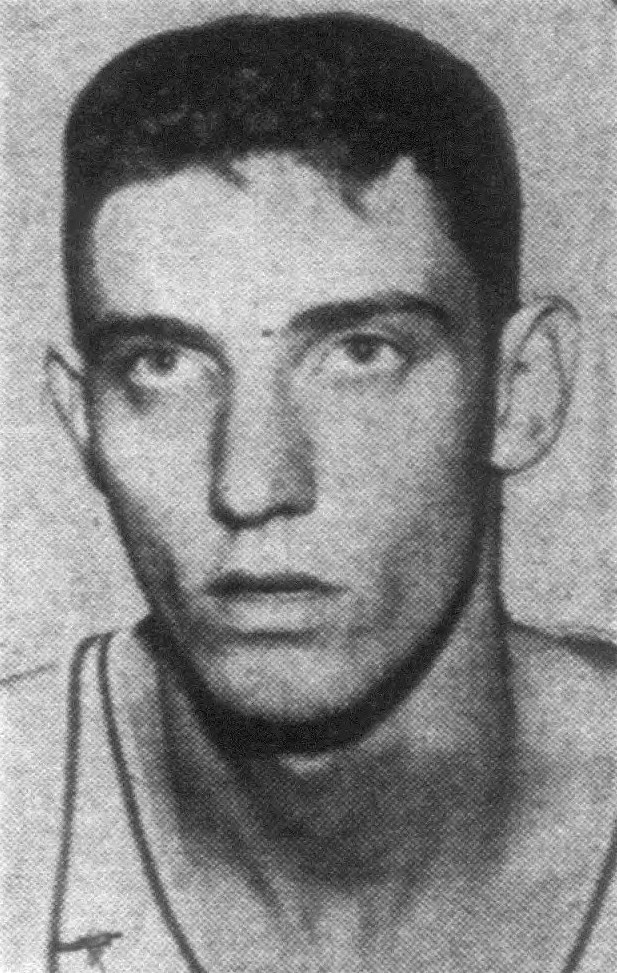
- Francis, circa 1953

Personal information
- Born: September 4, 1932 Hammondsville, Ohio, U.S.
- Died: June 3, 2015 (aged 82) Highlandtown, Ohio, U.S.
- Listed height: 6 ft 9 in (2.06 m)

Career information
- High school: Irondale (1948); Wellsville (1951)
- College: Rio Grande (1952–1954)
- NBA draft: 1956: 3rd round, 23rd overall pick
- Drafted by: Philadelphia Warriors
- Position: Forward
- Number: 32

Career highlights
- Second-team All-American – AP, UPI (1954); Third-team All-American – AP (1953)
- Stats at Basketball Reference

Clarence "Bevo" Francis (September 4, 1932 – June 3, 2015) was an American basketball player. Born on his family's farm in Hammondsville, Ohio, he became one of the most prolific scorers in college basketball history during his career at Rio Grande College (now known as the University of Rio Grande), topping over 100 points on two occasions. Standing 6 feet 9 inches (2.06 m) and known for his shooting touch, Francis held the NCAA record for points scored in a game from 1954 to 2012.

== Biography ==
Francis started his high school career in 1948 as a freshman at Irondale High School. In 1949 he transferred to nearby Wellsville High School when his father became employed by the Wellsville School District. Concerns about his eligibility prevented him from playing basketball in 1949 & 1950. In 1951, during his senior year in high school at Wellsville, Ohio, Francis scored 776 points in 25 games for an average of nearly 32 points per game. In the process, he led his team to a 19–1 regular season record and a berth in the state playoffs. He was a unanimous all-state performer.

In 1953, Francis averaged 48.3 points a game, which is an NCAA record. He actually averaged 50.1 points per game over the season, but the NCAA excluded some of his best games because they were against lesser competition, such as junior colleges. One of the games that did not count in the official totals was a 116-point game against Ashland Junior College.

In 1954, Francis averaged 48.0 points a game. He scored a then-record 113 in a single game, eclipsed in 2012 by Grinnell's Jack Taylor's 138 points against Faith Baptist Bible. Francis still holds the top two scoring averages in NAIA history, along with many NCAA records.

Francis, teammate Al Schreiber, and his coach Newt Oliver later signed with the Boston Whirlwinds, a barnstorming team that played against the Harlem Globetrotters. He was subsequently drafted by Philadelphia of the NBA, but opted to return home to his wife and family.

Francis died on June 3, 2015, due to complications of esophageal cancer in Highlandtown, Ohio. The Bevo Francis Award, which is given to the top small college basketball player in the United States, is named in his honor.

== Top scoring performances ==
- 116 vs Ashland Junior College of Kentucky 52–53. Now called the Ashland Community and Technical College
- 113 vs Hillsdale College 53–54
- 84 vs Alliance College 53–54
- 82 vs Bluffton College 53–54
- 76 vs Lees College 52–53
- 72 vs California State 52–53
- 69 vs Wilberforce University 52–53
- 68 vs Mountain State 52–53
- 64 vs Erie Tech 53–54

== See also ==
- List of basketball players who have scored 100 points in a single game
