= Wellsville Junior/Senior High School (Ohio) =

Location
- 1 Bengal Boulevard; Wellsville, Ohio 43965; United States
- Coordinates: 40°36′8″N 80°39′22″W

Information
- Type: Public, Coeducational high school
- Established: 1917
- School district: Wellsville Local School District
- Superintendent: Richard Bereschik
- Principal: Coy Sudvary
- Teaching staff: 22.00 (FTE)
- Grades: 8-12
- Student to teacher ratio: 11.18
- Colors: Orange and black
- Athletics conference: Eastern Ohio Athletic Conference; Ohio Valley Athletic Conference
- Team name: Tigers
- Yearbook: Tiger Tales
- Website: www.wellsville.k12.oh.us

Wellsville Junior/Senior High School is a public high school in Wellsville, Ohio, United States. It is the only high school in the Wellsville Local School District. Athletic teams are known as the Tigers and compete as a member of the Ohio High School Athletic Association in the Eastern Ohio Athletic Conference and the Ohio Valley Athletic Conference.

== History ==
Wellsville Junior/Senior High School serves students grades 8-12

In the early 1850s, Wellsville opened its first high school, which was originally known as Union High School. A second school was later constructed in 1875, then known as Central High School.

As population grew, Wellsville once again built a new high school in 1917 as Wellsville High School.

In the 1930s, a gymnasium was added along with more classrooms.

In 1996, a school levy was passed to construct a new Junior/Senior High School, which opened in 2001 at its current campus.

== Academics ==
Wellsville Senior High School offers courses in the traditional American curriculum. Entering their third and fourth years, students can elect to attend the Columbiana County Career and Technical Center in Lisbon as either a part-time or full-time student.

== Athletics ==
Wellsville Junior/Senior High School currently offers:

- Basketball
- Bowling
- Football
- Softball
- Soccer
- Track & Field
- Volleyball
- Wrestling

== Notable alumni ==
- Bevo Francis - former college basketball player
