= Firebase Nông Sơn =

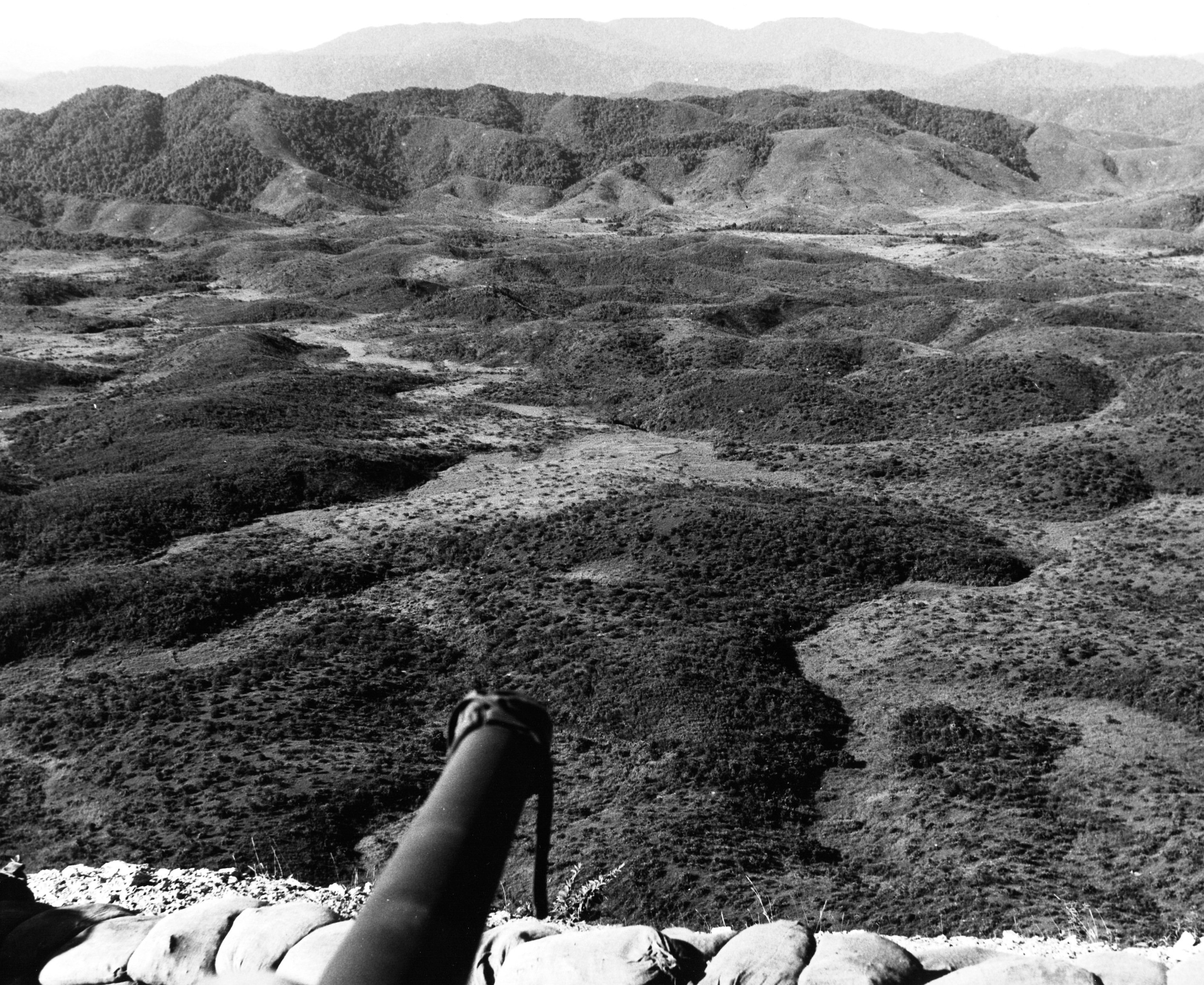
- View from Nông Sơn

Site information
- Type: Marines
- Condition: abandoned

Location
- Coordinates: 15.7956°N 108.023°E

Site history
- Built: 1967
- In use: 1967-74
- Battles/wars: Vietnam War

Garrison information
- Occupants: 1st Marine Division; 74th Ranger Battalion

Firebase Nông Sơn (also known as FSB Nông Sơn, Nông Sơn Combat Base and Nông Sơn Outpost) is a former U.S. Marine Corps fire support base southwest of Da Nang in Quảng Nam Province, Vietnam.

== History ==
The base was originally established in 1967 by the 5th Marines approximately 40 km southwest of Da Nang to provide security for the nearby Nông Sơn coal mine, the only such facility in South Vietnam.

The Marine base was established on and around Nông Sơn mountain, a 200m high hill. At the base of the mountain a reinforced platoon was dug in, a second reinforced platoon occupied the middle level and the third platoon with M40 recoilless rifles and 4.2 inch mortars occupied the mountaintop.

On the night of 3/4 July 1967 an estimated 400 People's Army of Vietnam (PAVN) attacked the base almost completely overrunning the Marine positions on the summit. The attack was beaten back with the loss of 13 U.S. dead and 42 PAVN. Marine PFC Melvin E. Newlin would be posthumously awarded the Medal of Honor for his actions that night.

Following the evacuation of Khâm Đức in May 1968, Detachment A-105, 5th Special Forces Group relocated their base to Nông Sơn adjacent to the Firebase.

In July 1974 the base, now known as Da Trach, was occupied by the Army of the Republic of Vietnam (ARVN) 74th Ranger Battalion. The 74th Rangers were scheduled to be replaced by the 3rd Battalion, 56th Infantry Regiment, 3rd Infantry Division who had arrived at Da Trach on 17 July. Shortly after midnight on 18 July the PAVN began bombarding Da Trach and the surrounding outposts at the start of the Battle of Duc Duc. Despite air and artillery support, PAVN ground assaults penetrated the base and by the afternoon of 18 July the ARVN had abandoned the base to the PAVN. The ARVN attempted to recover Da Trach but these attempts were abandoned by 25 July after the ARVN had suffered heavy losses.

== Current use ==
The base is abandoned and has reverted to jungle.
