= Episcopal Church of the Ascension and Manse =

Historic church in Ohio, United States

- U.S. National Register of Historic Places
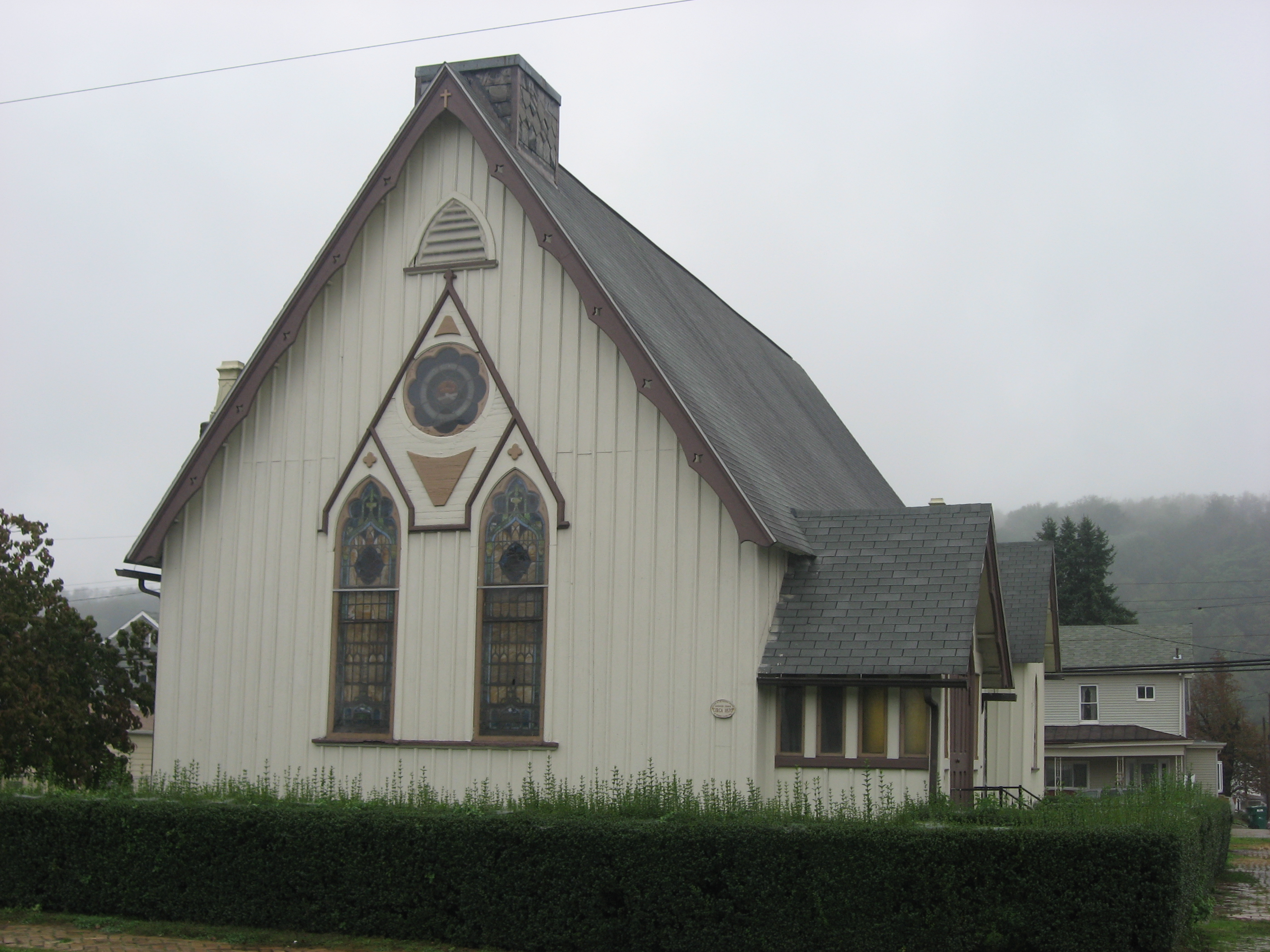
- Front of the church

- Location within Ohio Location within the United States
- Location: 1101 and 1109 Eleventh St., Wellsville, Ohio
- Coordinates: 40°36′8″N 80°39′3″W
- Area: 0.3 acres (0.12 ha)
- Built: 1870
- Architectural style: Gothic Revival, Vernacular Gothic Revival
- NRHP reference No.: 86001061
- Added to NRHP: May 15, 1986

Episcopal Church of the Ascension and Manse is a historic church at 1101 and 1109 Eleventh Street in Wellsville, Ohio.

It was built in 1870 in a Vernacular Gothic Revival style and added to the National Register of Historic Places in 1986.
