= Wellsville Local School District =

School district in Ohio

Coordinates: 40°36′13″N 80°38′57″W

Location
- Wellsville, Ohio United States

District information
- Type: Public school district
- Grades: Pre-K-12
- Superintendent: Richard E. Bereschik
- School board: Wellsville Board Of Education

Students and staff
- Enrollment: 744 (2017-18)
- Faculty: 59

Other information
- Website: wellsville.k12.oh.us

The Wellsville Local School District is a public school district serving the Wellsville area in southeastern Columbiana County in the U.S. state of Ohio.

Wellsville Jr./Sr. High School is the only high school in the district. The schools' sports teams are known as the Tigers, formerly the Bengals. Correspondingly, the colors are orange and black.

== Schools currently in operation by the school district ==
Current School Name	Original Name (if changed)	Year built	Current Grades Housed	Additional Info (Additions made, Architect, Current Status, Etc.)
Wellsville Jr./Sr. High School	Wellsville High School (2001-2013)	2001	8-12	
Daw Elementary School	Wellsville High School (1917-2001) Daw Junior High School (1954-2001) Daw Middle School (2001-2013)	1917	4-7	Byron D. Beacom Memorial Gymnasium built in 1939 Junior High School section built in 1954
Garfield Elementary School	-	1972	Pre-K-3	

== Historic schools no longer in operation by the school district ==
School name	Other Names Used	Year built	Year closed	Current Status
Central High School	Wellsville High School MacDonald School	1875	1954	Demolished Current site of MacDonald Elementary (1955)
West End School	Garfield School	1889	1950s	Demolished Current site is presently the parking-lot and playground area beside Covenant Presbyterian Church.
East End School	McKinley School	1881	Late 1960s	Demolished Current site is Wellsville McDonald's
Fairview Elementary School	Hillcrest-Fairview School	1938	2003	
MacDonald Elementary School		1956	2005	
