= Melvin E. Newlin =

United States Marine

Melvin Earl Newlin
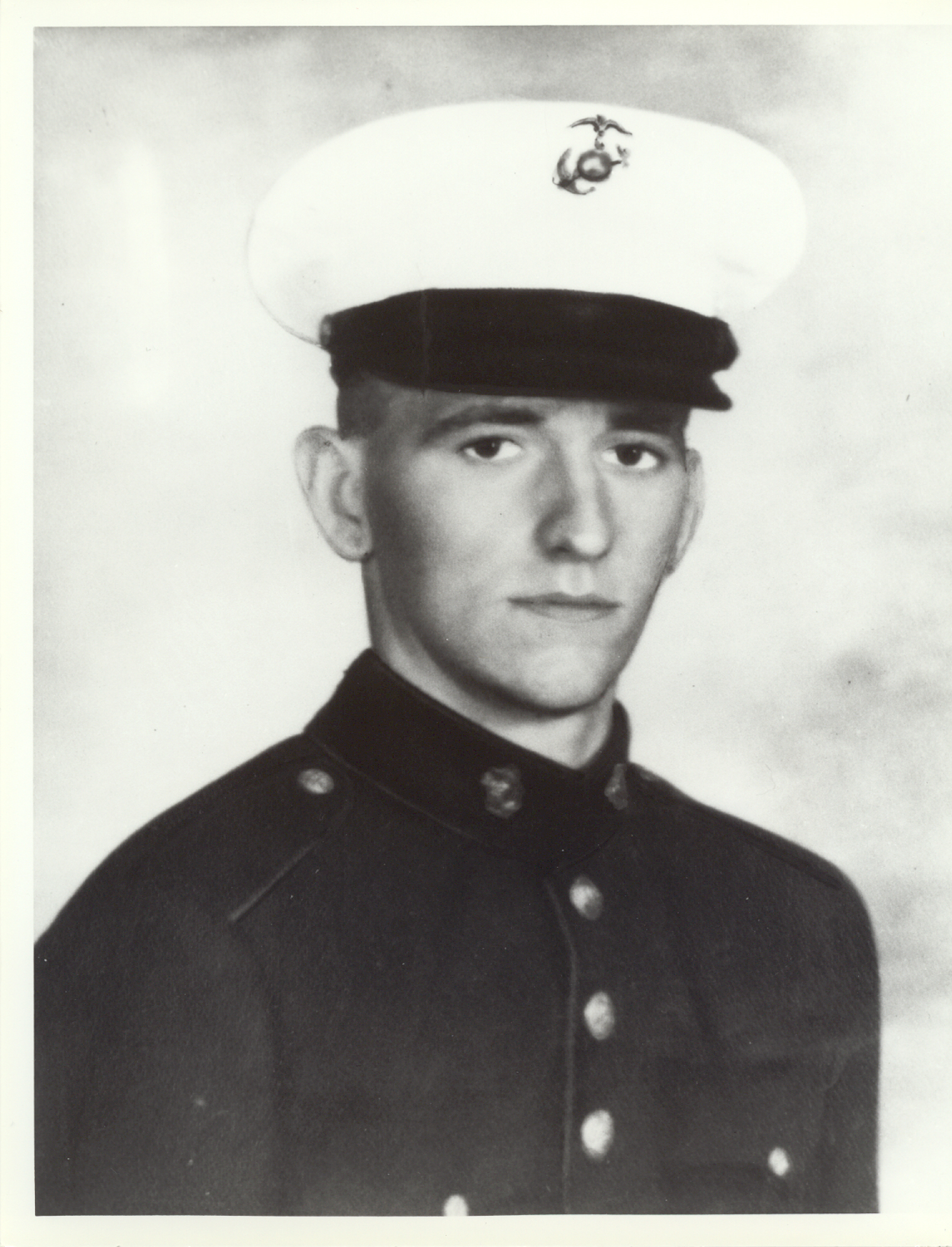
- Melvin E. Newlin, Medal of Honor recipient
- Born: September 27, 1948; Wellsville, Ohio, U.S.
- Died: July 4, 1967 (aged 18); Quảng Nam Province, South Vietnam
- Burial place: Spring Hill Cemetery, Wellsville, Ohio
- Military career
- Allegiance: United States of America
- Branch: United States Marine Corps
- Service years: 1966–1967
- Rank: Private First Class
- Units: Company F, 2nd Battalion 5th Marines, 1st Marine Division
- Conflicts: Vietnam War †
- Awards: Medal of Honor; Purple Heart

Private First Class Melvin Earl Newlin (September 27, 1948 – July 4, 1967) was a United States Marine who posthumously received the United States' highest military decoration – the Medal of Honor – for his actions in July 1967 during the Vietnam War.

== Biography ==
Melvin Earl Newlin was born on September 27, 1948, in the town of Wellsville, Ohio. He graduated from Wellsville High School on June 6, 1966.

On July 18, 1966, Newlin enlisted in the United States Marine Corps at Cleveland, Ohio, and was ordered to the Marine Corps Recruit Depot, Parris Island, South Carolina, where he received recruit training with the 1st Recruit Training Battalion.

Upon graduation in September 1966, he was transferred to Marine Corps Base Camp Lejeune, North Carolina, and underwent infantry training with the 2nd Infantry Training Battalion, 1st Infantry Training Regiment and then completed special weapons training.

In October 1966, he was assigned duty as a machine gunner with Company F, 2nd Battalion, 2nd Marines, 2nd Marine Division, at Camp Lejeune. He was promoted to private first class on January 1, 1967.

Newlin was transferred to the Republic of Vietnam in March 1967 and joined the 2nd Battalion, 5th Marines, 1st Marine Division, and participated in numerous operations, including Operations New Castle, Mountain Goat, Union, and Calhoun. While serving as a machine gunner with the 1st Platoon in Quảng Nam Province, he was mortally wounded on July 4, 1967.

He was buried with full military honors at Spring Hill Cemetery in Wellsville, Ohio.

== Awards and decorations ==
His medals and decorations include:

	Medal of Honor	
Purple Heart	National Defense Service Medal	Vietnam Service Medal
Vietnam Military Merit Medal	Vietnam Gallantry Cross with palm	Vietnam Campaign Medal

== Medal of Honor citation ==
The President of the United States in the name of the Congress takes pride in presenting the MEDAL OF HONOR posthumously to

PRIVATE FIRST CLASS MELVIN E. NEWLIN
UNITED STATES MARINE CORPS

for service as set forth in the following CITATION:

For conspicuous gallantry and intrepidity at the risk of his life above and beyond the call of duty while serving as a machine gunner attached to the First Platoon, Company F, Second Battalion, Fifth Marines, First Marine Division, in the Republic of Vietnam on 3 and 4 July 1967. Private Newlin with four other Marines, was manning a key position on the perimeter of the Nong Son outpost when the enemy launched a savage and well coordinated mortar and infantry assault, seriously wounding him and killing his four comrades. Propping himself against his machine gun, he poured a deadly accurate stream of fire into the charging ranks of the Viet Cong. Though repeatedly hit by small arms fire, he twice repelled enemy attempts to overrun his position. During the third attempt, a grenade explosion wounded him again and knocked him to the ground unconscious. The Viet Cong guerrillas, believing him dead, bypassed him and continued their assault on the main force. Meanwhile, Private Newlin regained consciousness, crawled back to his weapon, and brought it to bear on the rear of the enemy causing havoc and confusion among them. Spotting the enemy attempting to bring a captured 106 recoilless weapon to bear on other Marine positions, he shifted his fire, inflicting heavy casualties on the enemy and preventing them from firing the captured weapon. He then shifted his fire back to the primary enemy force, causing the enemy to stop their assault on the Marine bunkers and to once again attack his machine gun position. Valiantly fighting off two more enemy assaults, he firmly held his ground until mortally wounded. Private Newlin had single-handedly broken up and disorganized the entire enemy assault force, causing them to lose momentum and delaying them long enough for his fellow Marines to organize a defense and beat off their secondary attack. His indomitable courage, fortitude, and unwavering devotion to duty in the face of almost certain death reflected great credit upon himself and the Marine Corps and upheld the highest traditions of the United States Naval Service.

/S/ RICHARD M. NIXON

== In memory ==
- Newlin Hall in Quantico, Virginia, named in honor for PFC Newlin.
- A 5.3 mile stretch of Ohio State Route 7, between East Liverpool and Wellsville, was formally dedicated on June 6, 2004, as the Melvin E. Newlin Memorial Highway.
- The name Melvin E. Newlin is inscribed on the Vietnam Veterans Memorial ("The Wall") on Panel 23E, Row 005.
- "Melvin E Newlin" Chow hall in 62 area San Mateo, Marine Corps Base Camp Pendleton, Named in honor of PFC Newlin, Home of the 5th Marines Regiment where he served with 2nd Battalion 5th Marines.

== See also ==
- List of Medal of Honor recipients
- List of Medal of Honor recipients for the Vietnam War
