= Wellsville, Ohio =

- Village
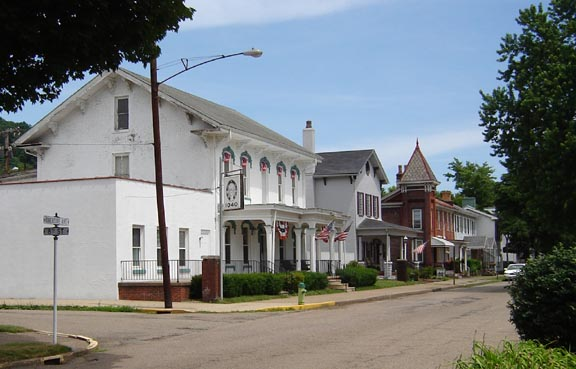
- Riverside Avenue
- Interactive map of Wellsville, Ohio
- Location within Ohio Location within the United States
- Coordinates: 40°36′15″N 80°39′18″W
- Country: United States
- State: Ohio
- County: Columbiana
- Settled: 1797
- Platted: 1823
- Named for: William Wells

Government
  - Type: Council–manager
  - Mayor: Robert Boley (D)

Area
  - Total: 1.91 sq mi (4.95 km^{2})
  - Land: 1.80 sq mi (4.67 km^{2})
  - Water: 0.11 sq mi (0.28 km^{2})
- Elevation: 715 ft (218 m)

Population (2020)
  - Total: 3,113
  - Density: 1,727.6/sq mi (667.02/km^{2})
- Time zone: UTC-5 (Eastern (EST))
  - Summer (DST): UTC-4 (EDT)
- ZIP code: 43968
- Area codes: 330, 234
- FIPS code: 39-82740
- GNIS feature ID: 1085906
- School district: Wellsville Local School District

Wellsville is a village in Columbiana County, Ohio, United States. The population was 3,113 at the 2020 census. Historically, the village was home to shipping industries along the Ohio River and Pennsylvania Railroad, along with pottery manufacturing.

== History ==
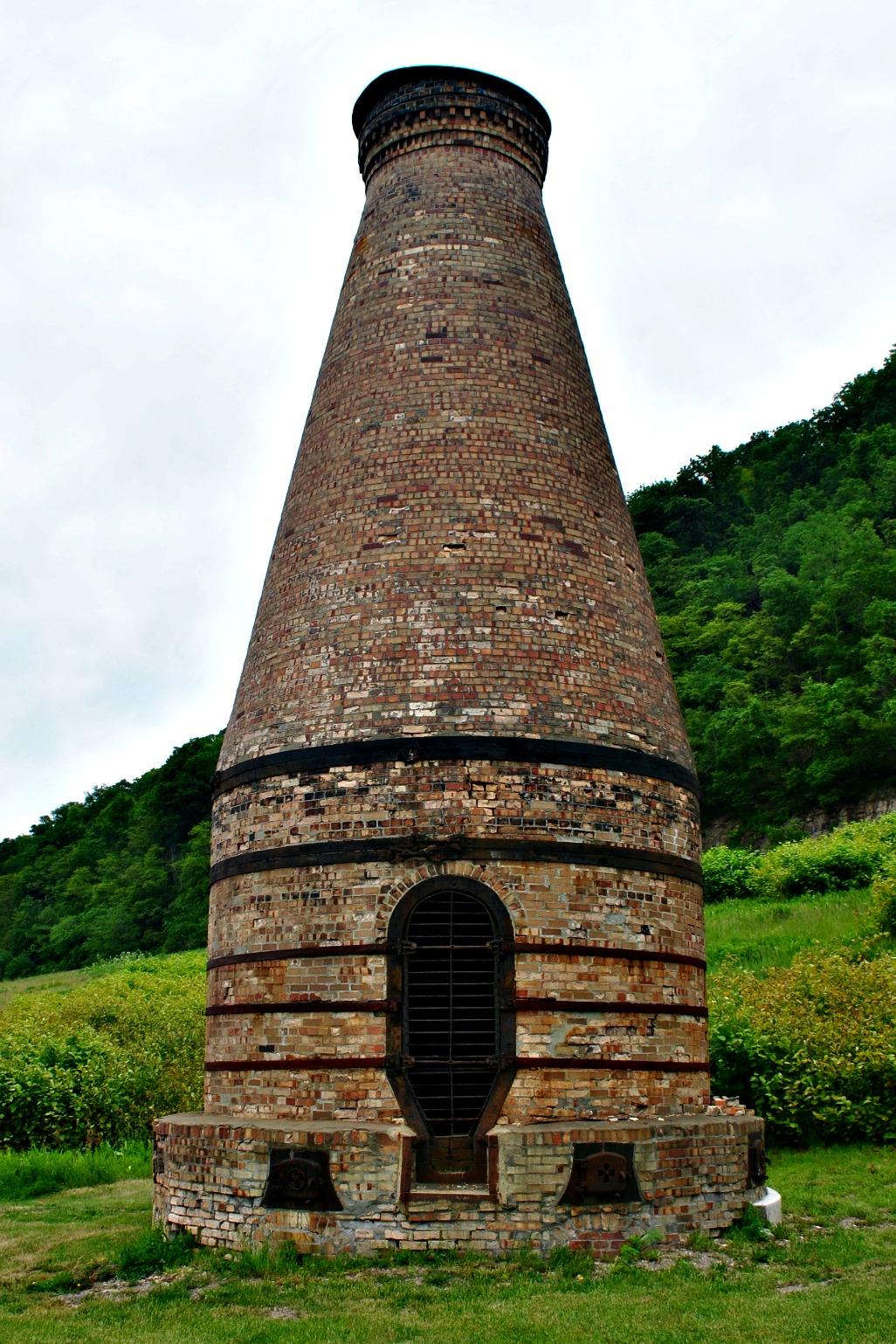
This bottle kiln was once part of the "stilt works" which was purchased in the 1920s by Acme Craft Pottery and moved for the construction of Ohio State Route 7

In 1770, George Washington, accompanied by his friend and personal surveyor William Crawford, embarked on a journey down the Ohio River from Pittsburgh to inspect lands designated for apportionment to soldiers who had served in the French and Indian War. They are reported to have surveyed the Wellsville area, just north of Yellow Creek, and Washington noted in his journal that it was good bottomland. In 1774, the Yellow Creek massacre occurred near Wellsville when a group of Virginian settlers killed the relatives of prominent Mingo leader Logan, who was camped on Yellow Creek. Logan took revenge, resulting in Lord Dunmore's War.

William Wells and his father-in-law, James Clark, are said to have first settled the area in 1795 after the Treaty of Greenville. They left for a time due to Native American attacks but returned permanently to farm in 1797. Wellsville's first school and church were also established before 1800. A barn built in 1807 by the Aten family was moved to Hale Farm and Village in Bath, Ohio. In 1814, a turnpike road was built to Lisbon, Ohio, and in 1816, a post office was established with John J. Feehan serving as postmaster.

Wells was a native of Bedford County, Pennsylvania, and a judge in nearby Steubenville, Ohio. He laid out Wellsville in 1820 and formally platted the community by October 1823. The initial site was bounded by the current Third and Fifth Streets, between Riverside Avenue and Commerce Street. In the 1820s, the first Methodist Episcopal Church was organized by Reverend John Callahan in the house of Wells. This is supposed to be the first Methodist Episcopal Church organized in Ohio. Shortly thereafter, Joseph Wells founded the Methodist Protestant Church.

In 1836, a foundry was opened to make steamboat machinery. It later became known as the Stevenson Company and produced brick-making machinery. Wellsville was incorporated as a village in 1848. In 1852, the Cleveland & Pittsburgh Railroad (later acquired by the Pennsylvania Railroad) built a track from Hanover, Ohio, to Wellsville, and in 1856 it built a track from Wellsville to Rochester, Pennsylvania.

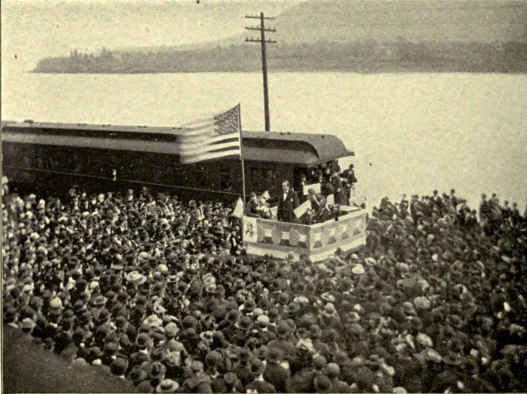
William Jennings Bryan on his whistle-stop presidential campaign in Wellsville, 1896

On February 14, 1861, Abraham Lincoln stopped in Wellsville and spoke to a large crowd in front of the Whitacre House hotel while on his way to his first inauguration. On July 26, 1863, Confederate general John Hunt Morgan and several hundred of his soldiers surrendered to pursuing Union forces after Morgan's Raid ended in nearby West Point, and were held in Wellsville before being shipped to the Ohio Penitentiary in Columbus. Morgan's Raid was the northernmost advance of Confederate troops during the American Civil War. At this time, Ohio State Route 45 was known as the Warren–Ashtabula Turnpike, which ran from Wellsville to Lake Erie. It was an important part of the Underground Railroad.

During the 1896 presidential campaign, Democratic candidate William Jennings Bryan addressed a crowd in Wellsville from the back of a train. Bryan was the first candidate to successfully embrace "whistle stop" campaigning, harnessing the power of a young rail network to reach masses of voters.

The 1936 flooding of the Ohio River resulted in the construction of a flood wall. In 1951, future college basketball star Bevo Francis scored 776 points in 25 games for an average of nearly 32 points per game with the Wellsville High School basketball team in his only year of varsity basketball. The 1870 Episcopal Church of the Ascension and Manse was listed on the National Register of Historic Places in 1986.

== Geography ==
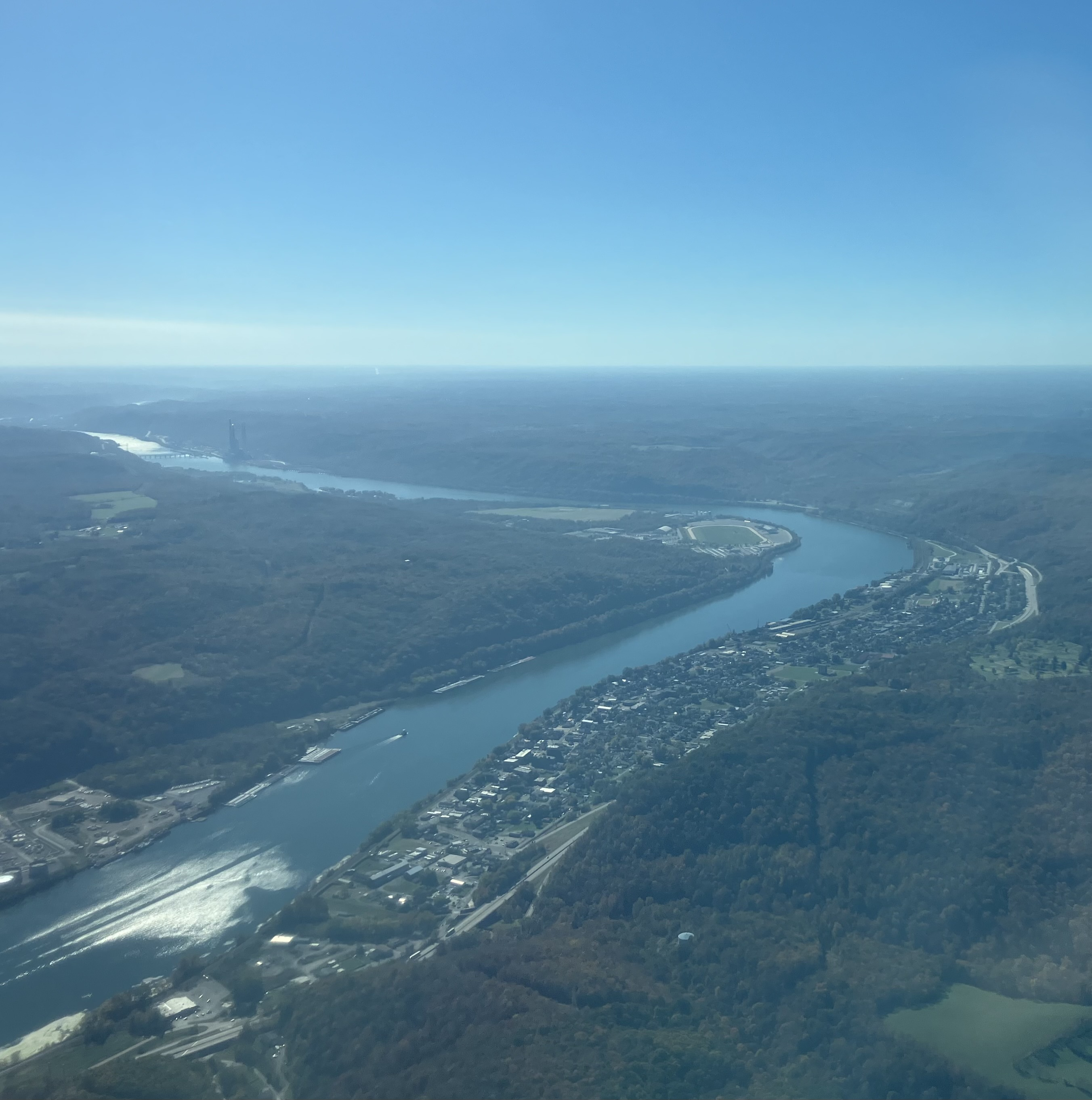
Aerial view of Wellsvile and the Ohio River, looking south

It is located on the Allegheny Plateau. Its southern border is the Ohio River. On its eastern border is the Little Yellow Creek and on its western border is the Yellow Cheek. Its northern border is rising hills.

According to the United States Census Bureau, the village has a total area of 1.91 square miles (4.95 km^{2}), of which 1.80 square miles (4.66 km^{2}) is land and 0.11 square miles (0.28 km^{2}) is water.

== Demographics ==
Historical population
Census	Pop.	Note	%±
1830	169		—
1840	759		349.1%
1850	1,546		103.7%
1860	1,587		2.7%
1870	2,313		45.7%
1880	3,377		46.0%
1890	5,247		55.4%
1900	6,146		17.1%
1910	7,769		26.4%
1920	8,849		13.9%
1930	7,956		−10.1%
1940	7,672		−3.6%
1950	7,854		2.4%
1960	7,117		−9.4%
1970	5,891		−17.2%
1980	5,095		−13.5%
1990	4,532		−11.1%
2000	4,133		−8.8%
2010	3,541		−14.3%
2020	3,113		−12.1%
U.S. Decennial Census

=== 2020 census ===
As of the 2020 census, Wellsville had a population of 3,113. The median age was 40.2 years. 23.3% of residents were under the age of 18 and 17.3% of residents were 65 years of age or older. For every 100 females there were 93.7 males, and for every 100 females age 18 and over there were 87.8 males age 18 and over.

0.0% of residents lived in urban areas, while 100.0% lived in rural areas.

There were 1,365 households in Wellsville, of which 28.2% had children under the age of 18 living in them. Of all households, 30.4% were married-couple households, 23.2% were households with a male householder and no spouse or partner present, and 36.4% were households with a female householder and no spouse or partner present. About 36.2% of all households were made up of individuals and 15.6% had someone living alone who was 65 years of age or older.

There were 1,632 housing units, of which 16.4% were vacant. The homeowner vacancy rate was 3.0% and the rental vacancy rate was 10.4%.

Racial composition as of the 2020 census
Race	Number	Percent
White	2,647	85.0%
Black or African American	221	7.1%
American Indian and Alaska Native	6	0.2%
Asian	3	0.1%
Native Hawaiian and Other Pacific Islander	0	0.0%
Some other race	10	0.3%
Two or more races	226	7.3%
Hispanic or Latino (of any race)	22	0.7%

=== 2010 census ===
As of the census of 2010, there were 3,541 people, 1,475 households, and 957 families residing in the village. The population density was 1,967.2 inhabitants per square mile (759.5/km^{2}). There were 1,774 housing units at an average density of 985.6 per square mile (380.5/km^{2}). The racial makeup of the village was 89.3% White, 6.8% African American, 0.1% Native American, 0.4% Asian, 0.5% from other races, and 3.0% from two or more races. Hispanic or Latino of any race were 1.2% of the population.

There were 1,475 households, of which 34.6% had children under the age of 18 living with them, 36.0% were married couples living together, 22.5% had a female householder with no husband present, 6.4% had a male householder with no wife present, and 35.1% were non-families. 30.8% of all households were made up of individuals, and 12.6% had someone living alone who was 65 years of age or older. The average household size was 2.40 and the average family size was 2.96.

The median age in the village was 37.6 years. 26% of residents were under the age of 18; 8.3% were between the ages of 18 and 24; 24.3% were from 25 to 44; 26.5% were from 45 to 64; and 14.8% were 65 years of age or older. The gender makeup of the village was 46.9% male and 53.1% female.

=== 2000 census ===
As of the census of 2000, there were 4,133 people, 1,696 households, and 1,107 families residing in the village. The population density was 2,348.4 inhabitants per square mile (906.7/km^{2}). There were 1,869 housing units at an average density of 1,062.0 per square mile (410.0/km^{2}). The racial makeup of the village was 90.59% White, 6.97% African American, 0.12% Native American, 0.12% Asian, 0.02% Pacific Islander, 0.05% from other races, and 2.13% from two or more races. Hispanic or Latino of any race were 0.39% of the population.

There were 1,696 households, out of which 31.4% had children under the age of 18 living with them, 42.0% were married couples living together, 19.0% had a female householder with no husband present, and 34.7% were non-families. 30.2% of all households were made up of individuals, and 15.6% had someone living alone who was 65 years of age or older. The average household size was 2.43 and the average family size was 3.02.

In the village, the population was spread out, with 26.3% under the age of 18, 9.5% from 18 to 24, 26.9% from 25 to 44, 21.4% from 45 to 64, and 16.0% who were 65 years of age or older. The median age was 37 years. For every 100 females, there were 86.9 males. For every 100 females age 18 and over, there were 80.8 males.

The median income for a household in the village was $26,198, and the median income for a family was $33,245. Males had a median income of $26,724 versus $19,904 for females. The per capita income for the village was $14,335. About 16.5% of families and 17.1% of the population were below the poverty line, including 23.3% of those under age 18 and 12.1% of those age 65 or over.

== Government ==
Wellsville operates under a council–manager government, where there are six council members elected as a legislature in addition to the mayor, who serves as an executive. All are elected for 4-year terms. The council employs a village manager and fiscal officer for administration. As of 2025, the mayor is Robert Boley (D), the village administrator is Jarrod Grimm, and the fiscal officer is Hoi Wah.

== Education ==
Children in Wellsville are served by the public Wellsville Local School District, which includes two elementary schools and Wellsville Junior/Senior High School.

Wellsville is also served by the Wellsville Carnegie Public Library. It was established on February 15, 1912. In 2005, the library loaned more than 55,000 items to its 8,000 cardholders. Total holdings as of 2005 are over 36,000 volumes with over 62 periodical subscriptions.

== Notable people ==
- Mary Bowermaster, American record holder in World Masters Athletics Championships
- Emma Bunting, stage actress
- Tom Casey, a Canadian Football League player, led the league in rushing yards from 1950 to 1956.
- Edward Knight Collins, shipping magnate who had a summer home in Wellsville
- John P. Elkin, attorney general and associate Supreme Court justice in Pennsylvania
- Bevo Francis, an NCAA basketball player who was one of the most prolific scorers in college basketball history during his career at Rio Grande College
- Wallace Samuel Gourley, United States district judge
- William P. Hepburn, U.S. Representative from Iowa's 8th District
- John Thomas MacKall, U.S. Army paratrooper during World War II
- Burr McIntosh, lecturer, photographer, film studio owner, silent film actor, author, and publisher of Burr McIntosh Monthly
- Melvin E. Newlin, United States Marine and Medal of Honor recipient
- Clete Patterson, NFL player
- Frank "Killjoy" Pucci, vocalist of the death metal band Necrophagia
- William Chapman Ralston, San Francisco businessman and financier, founder of the Bank of California
- James W. Reilly, Ohio state representative, general in the Union Army during the American Civil War
- P. Craig Russell, comic book illustrator
- Paul Travis, artist
- John Russell, an Emmy Award-winning journalist and labor reporter based in Wheeling, West Virginia.
