= Wayne Township, Columbiana County, Ohio =

Township in Ohio, US

- Township
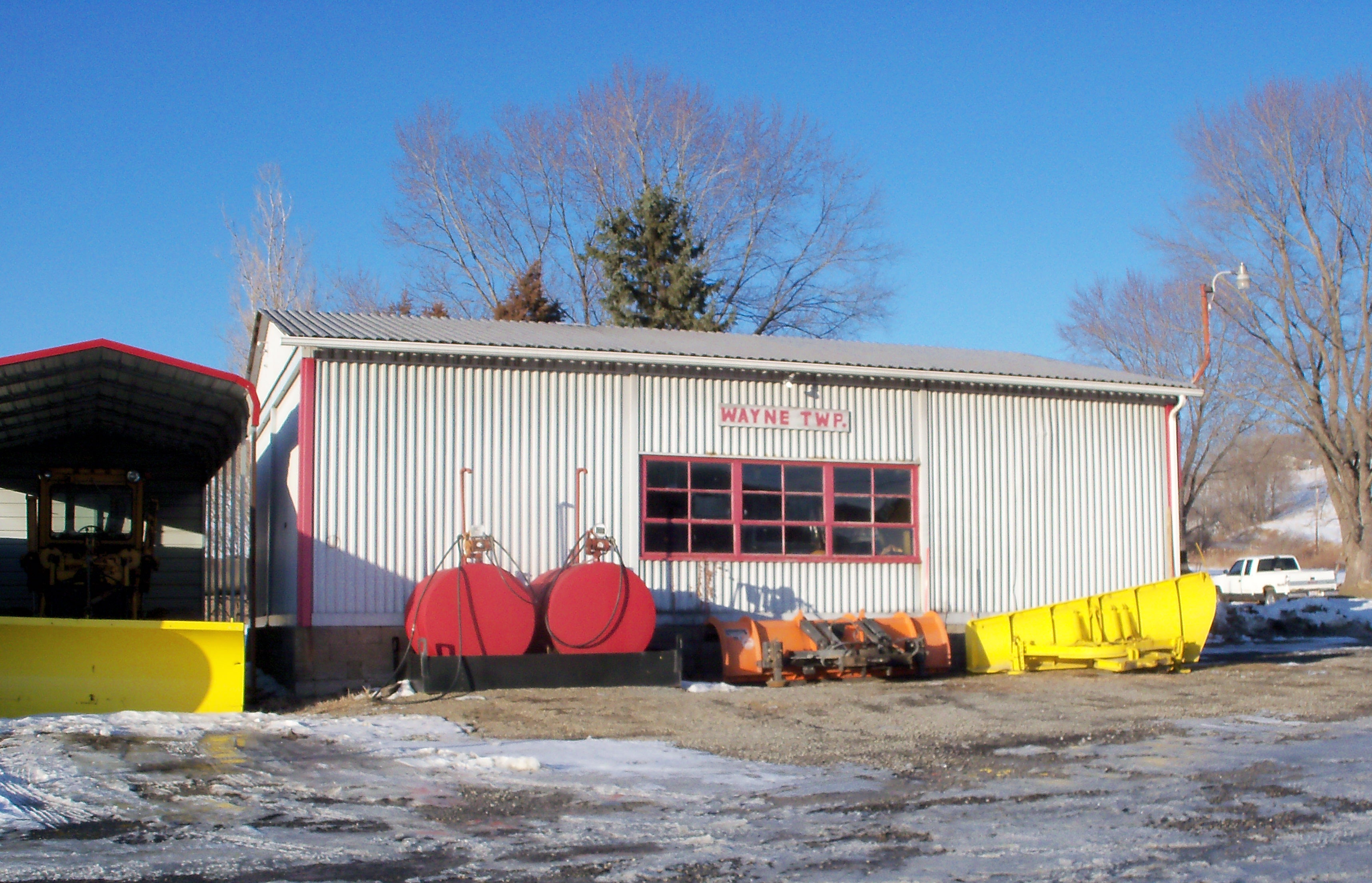
- Township garage

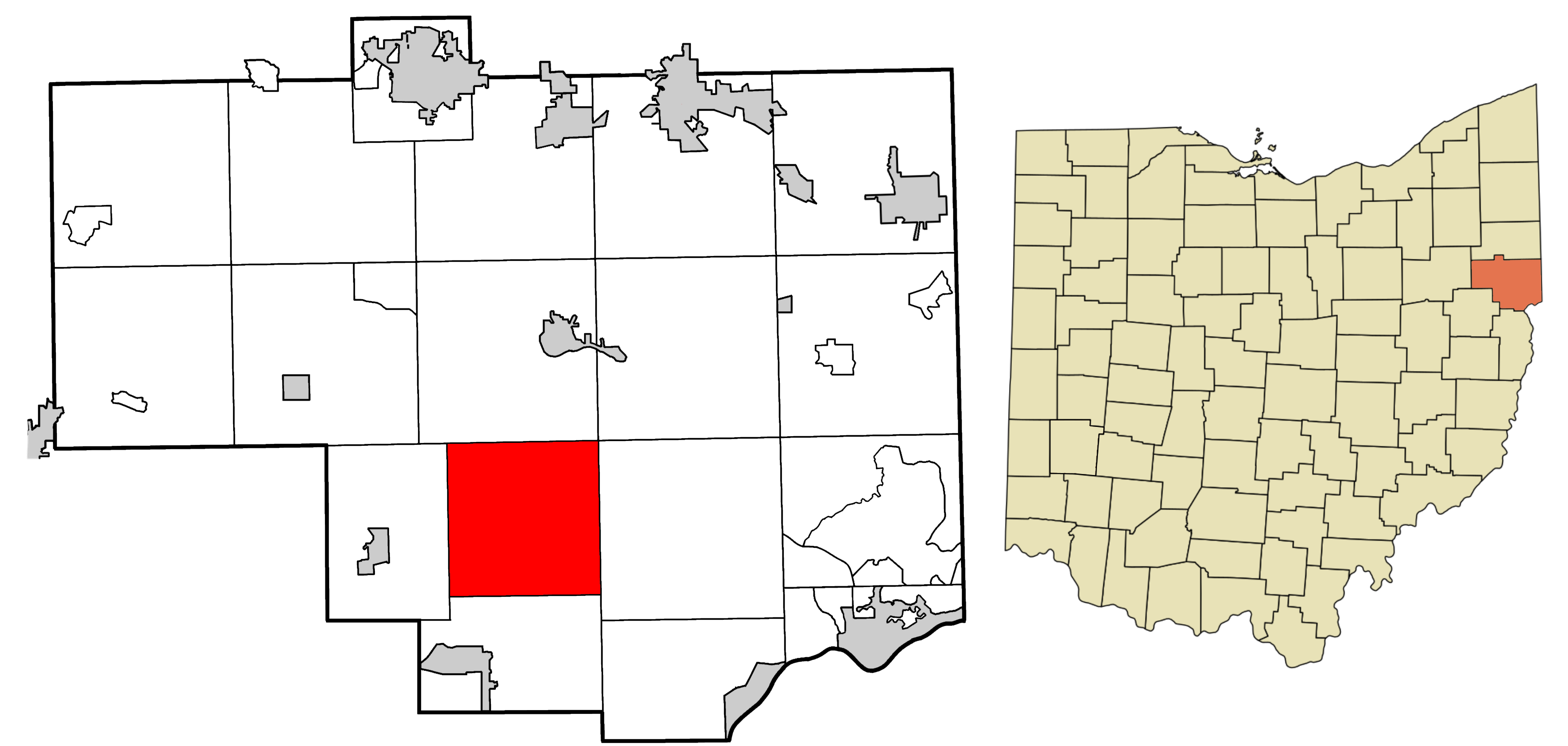
- Location of Wayne Township in Columbiana County
- Coordinates: 40°41′50″N 80°47′47″W
- Country: United States
- State: Ohio
- County: Columbiana

Area
  - Total: 25.0 sq mi (64.8 km^{2})
  - Land: 25.0 sq mi (64.7 km^{2})
  - Water: 0.039 sq mi (0.1 km^{2})
- Elevation: 1,161 ft (354 m)

Population (2020)
  - Total: 797
  - Density: 31.9/sq mi (12.3/km^{2})
- Time zone: UTC-5 (Eastern (EST))
  - Summer (DST): UTC-4 (EDT)
- FIPS code: 39-82138
- GNIS feature ID: 1085905

Wayne Township is one of the eighteen townships of Columbiana County, Ohio, United States. As of the 2020 census the population was 797.

== Geography ==
Located in the southern part of the county, it borders the following townships:

- Center Township - north
- Elkrun Township - northeast corner
- Madison Township - east
- Washington Township - south
- Franklin Township - west

No municipalities are located in Wayne Township.

== Name and history ==
Historical population
Census	Pop.	Note	%±
1980	741		—
1990	771		4.0%
2000	785		1.8%
2010	814		3.7%
2020	797		−2.1%

It is one of twenty Wayne Townships statewide.

The township was organized in 1806.

On July 26, 1863, Confederate Brig. Gen. John Hunt Morgan and his command surrendered to Federal forces on the Gavers-West Point Road one mile east of Prosperity Corners.

== Government ==
The township is governed by a three-member board of trustees, who are elected in November of odd-numbered years to a four-year term beginning on the following January 1. Two are elected in the year after the presidential election and one is elected in the year before it. There is also an elected township fiscal officer, who serves a four-year term beginning on April 1 of the year after the election, which is held in November of the year before the presidential election. Vacancies in the fiscal officership or on the board of trustees are filled by the remaining trustees.

=== Township Trustees ===
- Jim May, Chairman
- Edward J. Dailey, Vice Chairman
- Nathaniel Pirogowicz

=== Fiscal Officer ===
- Philadelphia D. Howells
