= Emma Bunting =

American actress

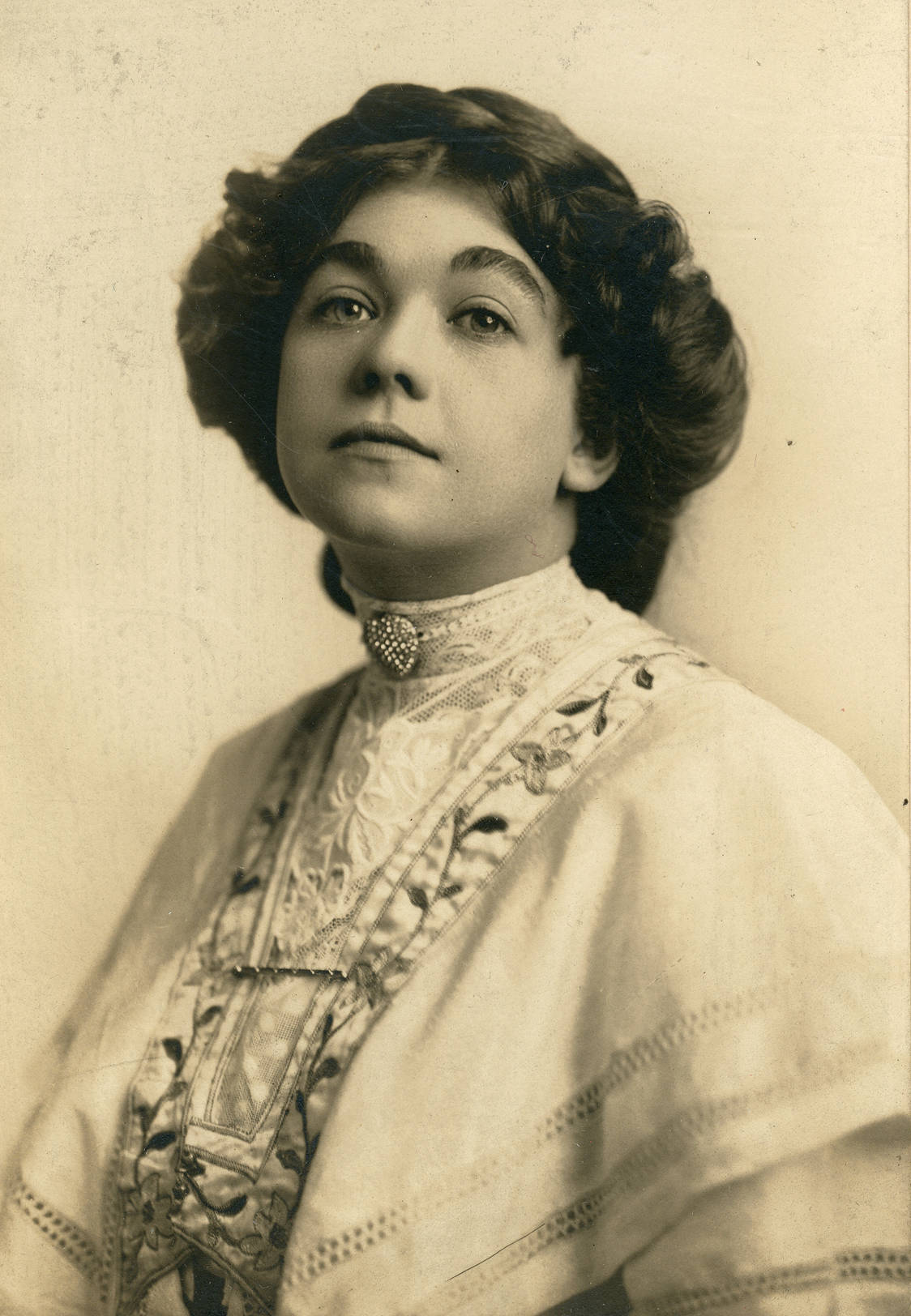
- Bunting in 1909 with the Earl Burgess Company
- Born: September 2, 1881
- Occupation: Actress
- Spouse(s): Charles H. Leyburne (m. 1899–1903) Earl Burgess (m. 1903)

Emma Bunting (born September 2, 1881) was an American stage actress during the late 19th and early 20th centuries. She was known as being a petite but versatile actress, taking on roles of children and adults alike in stage plays across the country. Initially taking on mostly minor rolls, she started to become notable sometime around 1905 and at one time was compared with Minnie Maddern Fiske. She would generally receive a better reception from southern audiences, being described by one newspaper as "the most unassuming little actress that has stopped in Topeka for many years."

She was married to Charles Leyburne, then considered a well known actor, until his death in 1903.

== Career ==
=== Early life and career ===
Bunting appeared on stage from a very young age, having developed an interest in acting when living in Wellsville, Ohio. Her parents Edward Bunting and Carrie Bright were not actors. Her talent was first recognised by Charles Leyburne, who got her onto the stage and ultimately married her.

=== Stage actress ===
Having initially taken on small parts for a number of years, Bunting began to become more well known around 1905 upon becoming a stock star. Under the management of Roy Applegate, she headed up her own company and had starred in leading roles on various plays, such as The Little Minister, The Bishop's Carriage and The Dawn of a Tomorrow. At one time, she was favorably compared with leading American actress Minnie Maddern Fiske, being considered a greater actress than Fiske was.

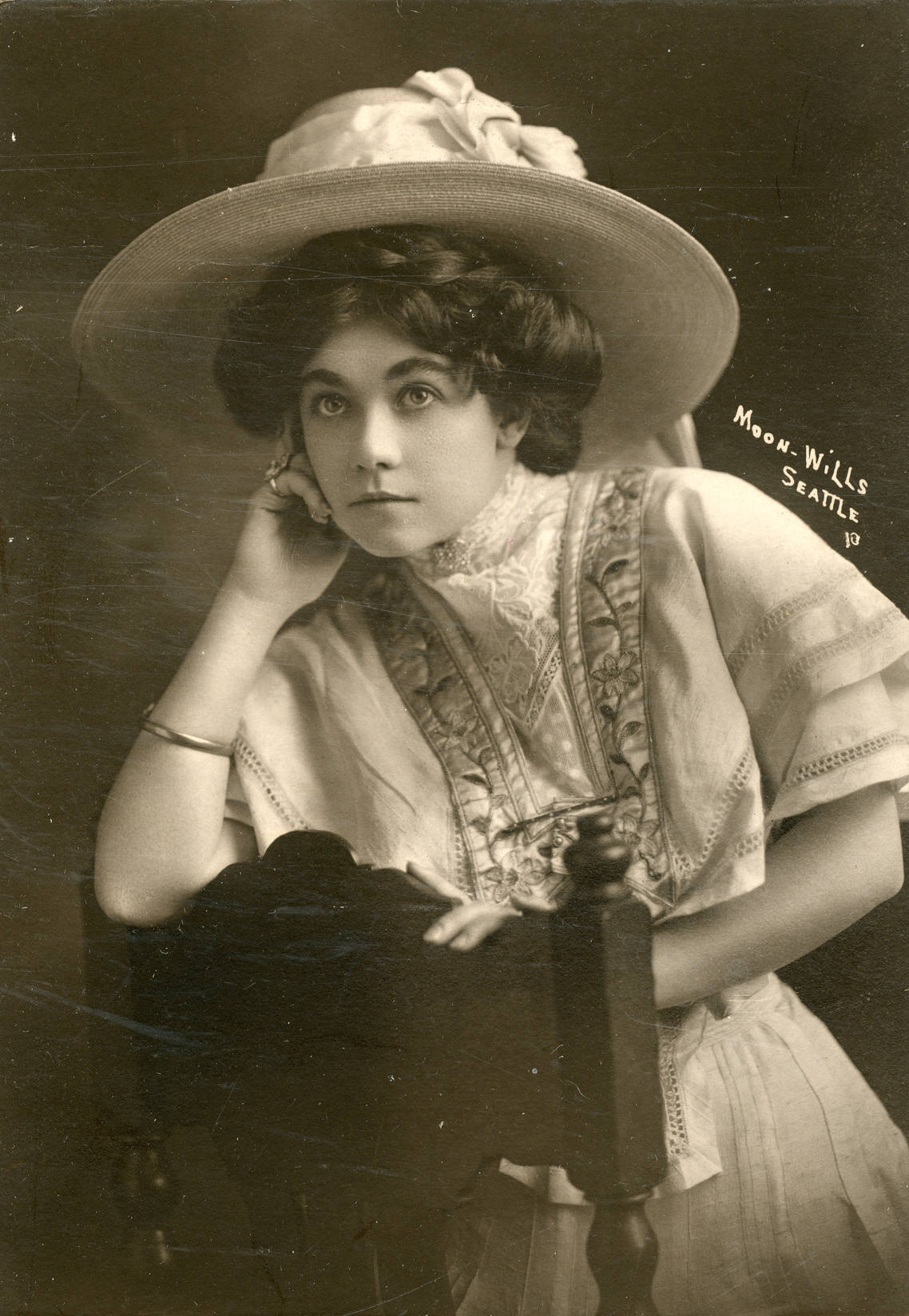
Bunting in 1907

Bunting was known to resent wearing wigs, something she needed to do on occasion, such as in the role of the character Lord Fauntleroy where she expressed that she liked playing the roles of boy, noting that "the things i'd rather do are the things the public doesn't want me to do." She observed that during a six-year period up to the end of 1913, she had changed her acting methods to remove declamation and climaxes, as she believed that what the public expected to watch and their expectations had changed towards more natural and calm performances. Her performances were generally better received by audiences in the south of the country, where she would tour cities such as Richmond, Atlanta and New Orleans, where she knew people and people knew her.

In 1915, she appeared as the lead role of Rebecca in a stage adaption of the 1909 play Rebecca of Sunnybrook Farm. Despite having appeared in various other roles, in which she was described as having "played badly and entirely out of her range and possibilities", she won plaudits for her portrayal of Rebecca and was compared favorably to Ursula St. George, who had played the part previously. By the time she reached her 30s, Bunting remained associated with characters many years younger, with one report suggesting that in her portrayal of a child in the play The Girl From Out Yonder, she was described as taking "the role of a 14-year-old girl with precise and perfect portrayal", with a voice and laugh to match. She was praised for her versatility, in particular during her performances in the play Lena Rivers, where she "first appears as a little barefooted girl", with audiences believing this to be her true person, yet would appear in the next act as an adult, with the change in character "as natural as if the years had actually made it." She was described as being "one of the most versatile little leading women on the American stage", in both acting and make-up credits.

She was praised for her role in a variation of the play Miss Lulu Bett, having abandoned her "giddy little personality" in a role different to what audiences were used to, with suggestions that by that time that she had "arrived at the highest point in her career."

== Personal ==
Bunting was described as being "the most unassuming little actress that has stopped in Topeka for many years." She declared avowedly to not being a suffragette and her only pet was a singing canary. She was 5 feet 3 inches (1.60 m) with dark blue eyes.

She was married to Charles Leyburne on May 22, 1899, who died in March 1903 at the age of 26 after a short illness of typhoid pneumonia, with no hope of recovery. At the time, Leyburne was one of the best known actors in Reading, Pennsylvania.

A report in the Pottsville Republican in April 1903, the month following the death of her first husband, suggested that Bunting had married fellow actor Earl Burgess, a known actor in the Pottsville, Pennsylvania area. However just 3 days later, this was disputed by other newspapers, who indicated a libel suit may follow. The following August, the Pottsville Republican again reported the marriage of the two actors, which was re-reported by other outlets in April 1904.
