= Washington Township, Columbiana County, Ohio =

Township in Ohio, US

- Township
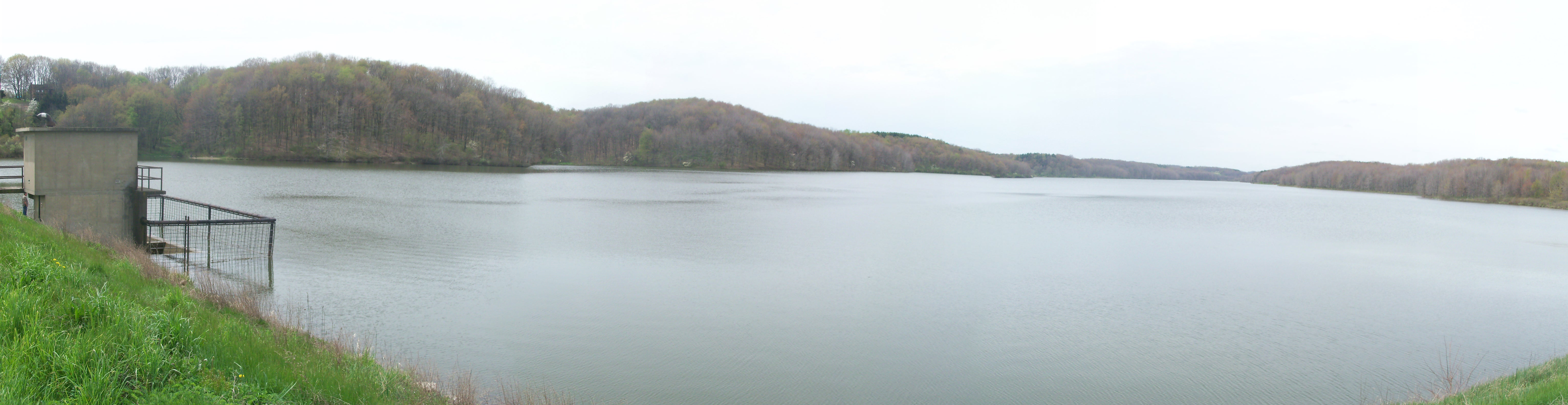
- Highlandtown Lake lies in the northeast corner of the township

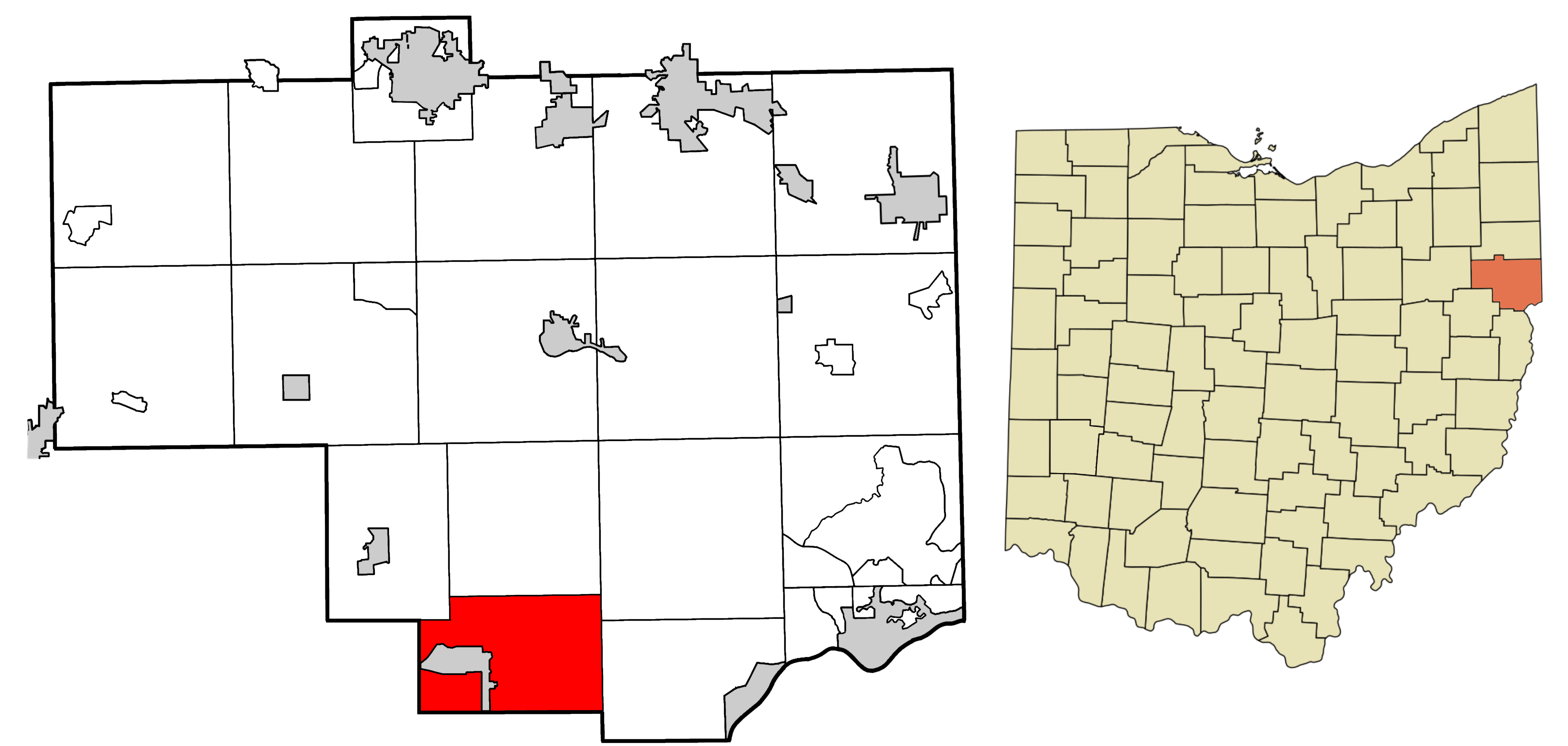
- Location of Washington Township in Columbiana County
- Coordinates: 40°37′31″N 80°49′19″W
- Country: United States
- State: Ohio
- County: Columbiana

Area
  - Total: 22.3 sq mi (57.8 km^{2})
  - Land: 22.0 sq mi (57.1 km^{2})
  - Water: 0.27 sq mi (0.7 km^{2})
- Elevation: 890 ft (270 m)

Population (2020)
  - Total: 2,002
  - Density: 90.8/sq mi (35.1/km^{2})
- Time zone: UTC-5 (Eastern (EST))
  - Summer (DST): UTC-4 (EDT)
- FIPS code: 39-81158
- GNIS feature ID: 1085904

Washington Township is one of the eighteen townships of Columbiana County, Ohio, United States. The 2020 census reported 2,002 people living in the township.

== Geography ==
Located in the southern part of the county, it borders the following townships:

- Wayne Township - north
- Madison Township - northeast
- Yellow Creek Township - east
- Brush Creek Township, Jefferson County - south
- Fox Township, Carroll County - west
- Franklin Township - northwest

One village is located in Washington Township:

- The village of Salineville, in the west

== Name and history ==
Historical population
| Census | Pop. | Note | %± |
|---|---|---|---|
| 1980 | 2,618 | | — |
| 1990 | 2,464 | | −5.9% |
| 2000 | 2,380 | | −3.4% |
| 2010 | 2,264 | | −4.9% |
| 2020 | 2,002 | | −11.6% |

It is one of forty-three Washington Townships statewide.

The township was organized in 1816, and was originally known as Saline Township.

== Government ==
The township is governed by a three-member board of trustees, who are elected in November of odd-numbered years to a four-year term beginning on the following January 1. Two are elected in the year after the presidential election and one is elected in the year before it. There is also an elected township fiscal officer, who serves a four-year term beginning on April 1 of the year after the election, which is held in November of the year before the presidential election. Vacancies in the fiscal officership or on the board of trustees are filled by the remaining trustees.

=== Township Trustees ===
- Charles Jarvis, Chairman
- James L. Sevek, Vice Chairman
- Pete Sambroak, Jr.

=== Fiscal Officer ===
- Tonya S. Sevek
