= 1905–06 collegiate men's basketball season in the United States =

American college basketball season

- Helms National Champions: Dartmouth (retroactive selection in 1943)
- Player of the Year (Helms): George Grebenstein, Dartmouth (retroactive selection in 1944)

The 1905–06 collegiate men's basketball season in the United States began in December 1905, progressed through the regular season, and concluded in March 1906.

== Rule changes ==
NOTE: These rules were in effect for the 1905–06 season, but it is unclear whether they were changes introduced for the 1905–06 season itself or prior to a previous, unidentified season.

- Games were played in two 20-minute halves separated by a 10-minute rest time.
- A timeout called while the ball was in play resulted in a jump ball when play resumed. A timeout called when the ball was out of bounds resulted in the team in possession of the ball retaining possession.
- Personal fouls were separated into two types. Class A fouls were general fouls called for delay of game; "tackling" the ball (i.e., touching the ball while a teammate already was touching it); kicking, striking, advancing, or hugging the ball; shooting after dribbling; tackling, holding, or pushing an opponent; and addressing the game officials. Class B fouls were more flagrant in nature, defined as striking, kicking, shouldering, tripping, or hacking an opponent; unnecessary roughness; and using profane or abusive language. If a player committed two class B fouls, he was disqualified for the remainder of the game.
- If a player was fouled in the act of shooting, his team automatically received one point. In addition, if his shot resulted in a field goal, the field goal counted for an additional two points. He also was given one free throw, worth one more point if it was successful.
- If a player touched the ball or the basket when the ball was on the edge of the rim, the referee awarded one point to the shooting team. This rule was the ancestor of what later would become known as "defensive goaltending."
- Each game had a referee, an umpire, two inspectors, and an official scorer. The referee, who served as the senior official and ultimate authority for the game, mainly called fouls and was responsible for starting and stopping play. The umpire, who reported to the referee, also called fouls. The inspectors had no decision-making powers but served as the referee's assistants, with one stationed at each end of the court and responsible for determining whether goals were scored in accordance with the rules, which they reported to the referee. The official scorer kept track of the scoring and fouls for each player and each team.
- The home team appointed a timekeeper. The visiting team had the option of appointing an assistant timekeeper, but was not required to.
- The clock continued to run during dead-ball situations, such as when the ball was out of bounds or during free throws. The clock stopped only when ordered by the referee.

== Season headlines ==
- The Western Conference (the future Big Ten Conference) sponsored its first conference basketball season and recognized a regular-season champion for the first time.
- In February 1943, the Helms Athletic Foundation retroactively selected Dartmouth as its national champion for the 1905–06 season.
- In 1995, the Premo-Porretta Power Poll retroactively selected Wabash as its top-ranked team for the 1905–06 season.

== Conference membership changes ==
School	Former Conference	New Conference
Harvard Crimson	Independent	Eastern Intercollegiate Basketball League
Illinois Fighting Illini	No major basketball program	Western Conference
Northwestern Wildcats	Western Conference	No major basketball program

== Regular season ==
=== Conferences ===
Conference	Regular Season Winner	Conference Player of the Year	Conference Tournament	Tournament Venue (City)	Tournament Winner
Eastern Intercollegiate Basketball League	Penn	None selected	No Tournament		
Western Conference	Minnesota	None selected	No Tournament		

1905–06 Eastern Intercollegiate Basketball League standings
	Conf.				Overall
Team	W		L	PCT	W		L	PCT
Penn	9	–	1	.900	16	–	4	.800
Columbia	7	–	3	.700	12	–	4	.750
Harvard	6	–	4	.600	12	–	4	.750
Yale	4	–	6	.400	11	–	17	.393
Princeton	3	–	7	.300	5	–	10	.333
Cornell	1	–	9	.100	2	–	10	.167

1905–06 Western Conference men's basketball standings
	Conf.				Overall
Team	W		L	PCT	W		L	PCT
Minnesota	6	–	1	.857	13	–	2	.867
Wisconsin	6	–	2	.750	12	–	2	.857
Indiana	2	–	2	.500	7	–	9	.438
Chicago	3	–	5	.375	5	–	5	.500
Purdue	3	–	6	.333	4	–	7	.364
Illinois	3	–	6	.333	6	–	8	.429
Iowa	-	–	-	–	11	–	5	.688

=== Independents ===
A total of 84 college teams played as major independents. Among independents that played 10 or more games, Oregon Agricultural (10–0) finished with the best winning percentage (1.000) and Baker (18–3) with the most wins.

1905–06 collegiate men's basketball independents standings
	Conf.				Overall
Team	W		L	PCT	W		L	PCT
Oregon Agricultural		–		–	10	–	0	1.000
Rhode Island A&M		–		–	5	–	0	1.000
Southwestern (Kan.)		–		–	6	–	0	1.000
Wabash		–		–	17	–	1	.944
Massachusetts Lowell		–		–	16	–	1	.941
Brigham Young		–		–	11	–	1	.917
Ohio State		–		–	9	–	1	.900
Dartmouth		–		–	16	–	2	.889
North Dakota		–		–	8	–	1	.889
Fordham		–		–	14	–	2	.875
Texas		–		–	7	–	1	.875
Baker		–		–	18	–	3	.857
Westminster (Pa.)		–		–	12	–	2	.857
Michigan State		–		–	11	–	2	.846
Bucknell		–		–	10	–	2	.833
Denison		–		–	10	–	2	.833
Montana State		–		–	5	–	1	.833
Williams		–		–	14	–	3	.824
Western Reserve		–		–	13	–	3	.813
Holy Cross		–		–	12	–	3	.800
Nebraska		–		–	12	–	3	.800
Virginia		–		–	8	–	2	.800
William & Mary		–		–	4	–	1	.800
Dayton		–		–	7	–	2	.778
Illinois State		–		–	6	–	2	.750
Syracuse		–		–	9	–	3	.750
Swarthmore		–		–	11	–	4	.733
Maine		–		–	10	–	4	.714
Springfield (Mass.)		–		–	10	–	4	.714
Allegheny		–		–	12	–	5	.706
Wooster		–		–	7	–	3	.700
Cincinnati		–		–	2	–	1	.667
Connecticut		–		–	6	–	3	.667
Grinnell		–		–	8	–	4	.667
Niagara		–		–	4	–	2	.667
Army		–		–	7	–	4	.636
Gettysburg		–		–	7	–	4	.636
Kansas		–		–	12	–	7	.632
Manhattan		–		–	6	–	4	.600
Mount Union		–		–	9	–	6	.600
Penn State		–		–	6	–	4	.600
Wesleyan (Conn.)		–		–	12	–	8	.600
Wyoming		–		–	3	–	2	.600
Canisius		–		–	10	–	7	.588
Washburn		–		–	10	–	7	.588
Idaho		–		–	4	–	3	.571
Lake Forest		–		–	9	–	7	.563
North Dakota Agricultural		–		–	5	–	4	.556
West Virginia		–		–	5	–	4	.556
Colorado		–		–	6	–	5	.545
Colgate		–		–	7	–	6	.538
Butler		–		–	1	–	1	.500
Colorado Agricultural		–		–	2	–	2	.500
Indiana State		–		–	6	–	6	.500
Lehigh		–		–	6	–	6	.500
Miami (Ohio)		–		–	3	–	3	.500
Nebraska Wesleyan		–		–	7	–	7	.500
New Mexico		–		–	2	–	2	.500
Wake Forest		–		–	3	–	3	.500
Washington State		–		–	5	–	5	.500
Akron		–		–	6	–	7	.462
Denver		–		–	6	–	7	.462
Bradley		–		–	4	–	5	.444
Delaware		–		–	3	–	4	.429
Temple		–		–	3	–	4	.429
Bloomsburg		–		–	2	–	3	.400
Trinity (N.C.)		–		–	2	–	3	.400
Kansas State		–		–	6	–	9	.400
Grove City		–		–	3	–	5	.375
Brown		–		–	4	–	7	.364
Kentucky		–		–	5	–	9	.357
Augustana (Ill.)		–		–	3	–	6	.333
Fairmount		–		–	2	–	4	.333
Wisconsin–Stevens Point		–		–	2	–	4	.333
Trinity (Conn.)		–		–	3	–	7	.300
Washington University		–		–	1	–	3	.250
Utah Agricultural		–		–	2	–	7	.222
CCNY		–		–	1	–	4	.200
Pittsburgh		–		–	2	–	9	.182
New Mexico A&M		–		–	0	–	1	.000
Oregon		–		–	0	–	5	.000

== Awards ==
=== Helms College Basketball All-Americans ===
The practice of selecting a Consensus All-American Team did not begin until the 1928–29 season. The Helms Athletic Foundation later retroactively selected a list of All-Americans for the 1905–06 season.

Player	Team
Harold Amberg	Harvard
Garfield Brown	Minnesota
Eugene Cowell	Williams
George Flint	Penn
George Grebenstein	Dartmouth
Ralph Griffiths	Harvard
Marcus Hurley	Columbia
Charles Keinath	Penn
James McKeag	Chicago
John Schommer	Chicago

=== Major player of the year awards ===
- Helms Player of the Year: George Grebenstein, Dartmouth (retroactive selection in 1944)

== Coaching changes ==
A number of teams changed coaches during the season and after it ended.

Team	Former Coach	Interim Coach	New Coach	Reason
Brown	Oscar Rackle		W. W. Reynolds	
Butler	Edgar Wingard		Art Guedel	
Canisius	John Schmitt		J. P. Quinlisk	
Chicago	Wilfred Childs		Joseph Raycroft	
Eastern Washington	Nick E. Hinch		Paul Lienau	
Fordham	Loren Black		Frank O'Donnell	
Illinois	Elwood Brown		Frank L. Pinckney	
Illinois State	John P. Stewart		William Bawden	
Indiana	Zora Clevenger		James M. Sheldon	
Iowa	Ed Rule		John G. Griffith	
Kansas State	Charles W. Melick		Mike Ahearn	
Maine	George Owen		John Phelan	
Miami (Ohio)	Carroll Hoel		John Snyder	
Niagara	Charles McGrath		John M. Reed	
Northern Illinois	Harry Sauthoff		Nelson A. Kellogg	
Northern Iowa	Charles Pell		Roy F. Seymour	
Oregon	Walter C. Winslow		Hugo Bezdek	
Princeton	Frederick Cooper		William Kelleher	
William & Mary	J. Merrill Blanchard		H.W. Withers	
Wyoming	W. Yates		Lt. Coburn	
