= 1905–06 Kansas Jayhawks men's basketball team =

American college basketball season

1905–06 Kansas Jayhawks men's basketball
- Conference: Independent
- Record: 12–7
- Head coach: James Naismith (8th season)
- Captain: Milton Miller
- Home arena: Snow Hall

1905–06 collegiate men's basketball independents standings
	Conf.				Overall
Team	W		L	PCT	W		L	PCT
Oregon Agricultural		–		–	10	–	0	1.000
Rhode Island A&M		–		–	5	–	0	1.000
Southwestern (Kan.)		–		–	6	–	0	1.000
Wabash		–		–	17	–	1	.944
Massachusetts Lowell		–		–	16	–	1	.941
Brigham Young		–		–	11	–	1	.917
Ohio State		–		–	9	–	1	.900
Dartmouth		–		–	16	–	2	.889
North Dakota		–		–	8	–	1	.889
Fordham		–		–	14	–	2	.875
Texas		–		–	7	–	1	.875
Baker		–		–	18	–	3	.857
Westminster (Pa.)		–		–	12	–	2	.857
Michigan State		–		–	11	–	2	.846
Bucknell		–		–	10	–	2	.833
Denison		–		–	10	–	2	.833
Montana State		–		–	5	–	1	.833
Williams		–		–	14	–	3	.824
Western Reserve		–		–	13	–	3	.813
Holy Cross		–		–	12	–	3	.800
Nebraska		–		–	12	–	3	.800
Virginia		–		–	8	–	2	.800
William & Mary		–		–	4	–	1	.800
Dayton		–		–	7	–	2	.778
Illinois State		–		–	6	–	2	.750
Syracuse		–		–	9	–	3	.750
Swarthmore		–		–	11	–	4	.733
Maine		–		–	10	–	4	.714
Springfield (Mass.)		–		–	10	–	4	.714
Allegheny		–		–	12	–	5	.706
Wooster		–		–	7	–	3	.700
Cincinnati		–		–	2	–	1	.667
Connecticut		–		–	6	–	3	.667
Grinnell		–		–	8	–	4	.667
Niagara		–		–	4	–	2	.667
Army		–		–	7	–	4	.636
Gettysburg		–		–	7	–	4	.636
Kansas		–		–	12	–	7	.632
Manhattan		–		–	6	–	4	.600
Mount Union		–		–	9	–	6	.600
Penn State		–		–	6	–	4	.600
Wesleyan (Conn.)		–		–	12	–	8	.600
Wyoming		–		–	3	–	2	.600
Canisius		–		–	10	–	7	.588
Washburn		–		–	10	–	7	.588
Idaho		–		–	4	–	3	.571
Lake Forest		–		–	9	–	7	.563
North Dakota Agricultural		–		–	5	–	4	.556
West Virginia		–		–	5	–	4	.556
Colorado		–		–	6	–	5	.545
Colgate		–		–	7	–	6	.538
Butler		–		–	1	–	1	.500
Colorado Agricultural		–		–	2	–	2	.500
Indiana State		–		–	6	–	6	.500
Lehigh		–		–	6	–	6	.500
Miami (Ohio)		–		–	3	–	3	.500
Nebraska Wesleyan		–		–	7	–	7	.500
New Mexico		–		–	2	–	2	.500
Wake Forest		–		–	3	–	3	.500
Washington State		–		–	5	–	5	.500
Akron		–		–	6	–	7	.462
Denver		–		–	6	–	7	.462
Bradley		–		–	4	–	5	.444
Delaware		–		–	3	–	4	.429
Temple		–		–	3	–	4	.429
Bloomsburg		–		–	2	–	3	.400
Trinity (N.C.)		–		–	2	–	3	.400
Kansas State		–		–	6	–	9	.400
Grove City		–		–	3	–	5	.375
Brown		–		–	4	–	7	.364
Kentucky		–		–	5	–	9	.357
Augustana (Ill.)		–		–	3	–	6	.333
Fairmount		–		–	2	–	4	.333
Wisconsin–Stevens Point		–		–	2	–	4	.333
Trinity (Conn.)		–		–	3	–	7	.300
Washington University		–		–	1	–	3	.250
Utah Agricultural		–		–	2	–	7	.222
CCNY		–		–	1	–	4	.200
Pittsburgh		–		–	2	–	9	.182
New Mexico A&M		–		–	0	–	1	.000
Oregon		–		–	0	–	5	.000

The 1905–06 Kansas Jayhawks men's basketball team represented the University of Kansas in its eighth season of collegiate basketball. The head coach was James Naismith, the inventor of the game, who served his 8th year in that capacity. The Jayhawks finished the season 12–7, their first winning record since the 1898–99 season. Phog Allen, who would later become the Jayhawks head coach, played on the team.

== Roster ==
- Frank Barlow
- Ralph Bergen
- Forrest Allen
- Charles Johnson
- Milton Miller
- William Miller
- Charles Siler
- Cecil Smith
- Roscoe Winnagle

== Schedule ==
Date time, TV	Opponent	Result	Record	Site city, state
Dec. 13, 1905*	at Emporia State	W 33–22	1–0	Emporia, Kansas
Dec. 14, 1905*	at Newton	L 18–23	1–1	Newton, Kansas
Dec. 16, 1905*	at Chilocco	W 43–17	2–1	Chilocco, Oklahoma
Dec. 18, 1905*	at Baker	L 18–22	2–2	Baldwin, Kansas
Jan. 15, 1906*	Chilocco	W 19–11	3–2	Lawrence, Kansas
Jan. 19, 1906*	at Washburn	W 22–19	4–2	Topeka, Kansas
Feb. 8, 1906*	at Wyandotte AC	W 40–10	5–2	Kansas City, Kansas
Feb. 9, 1906*	at Independence AC	W 43–16	6–2	Independence, Missouri
Feb. 10, 1906*	at Kansas City YMCA	W 56–6	7–2	Kansas City, Missouri
Feb. 12, 1906*	at Nebraska	W 37–17	8–2	Lincoln, Nebraska
Feb. 13, 1906*	at Des Moines YMCA	W 25–20	9–2	Des Moines, Iowa
Feb. 14, 1906*	at Iowa	L 20–28	9–3	Iowa City, Iowa
Feb. 15, 1906*	at Armour Institute	W 34–25	10–3	Chicago, Illinois
Feb. 16, 1906*	at Evanston YMCA	L 13–29	10–4	Evanston, Illinois
Feb. 17, 1906*	at Chicago Central YMCA	L 12–35	10–5	Chicago, IL
Feb. 19, 1906*	at Muscatine YMCA	L 19–43	10–6	Muscatine, Iowa
Feb. 20, 1906*	at Fairfield	L 39–42	10–7	Fairfield, Iowa
Feb. 28, 1906*	Washburn	W 39–12	11–7	Lawrence, Kansas
Mar. 3, 1906*	Emporia State	W 60–13	12–7	Lawrence, Kansas
*Non-conference game. ^{#}Rankings from AP Poll. (#) Tournament seedings in parentheses. All times are in Central Standard Time.
