= 1905–06 Dartmouth Big Green men's basketball team =

American college basketball season

1905–06 Dartmouth Big Green men's basketball

Helms Foundation National Champions
- Conference: Independent
- Record: 16–2
- Head coach: No coach
- MVP: George Grebenstein
- Captain: William P. McGrail

1905–06 collegiate men's basketball independents standings
	Conf.				Overall
Team	W		L	PCT	W		L	PCT
Oregon Agricultural		–		–	10	–	0	1.000
Rhode Island A&M		–		–	5	–	0	1.000
Southwestern (Kan.)		–		–	6	–	0	1.000
Wabash		–		–	17	–	1	.944
Massachusetts Lowell		–		–	16	–	1	.941
Brigham Young		–		–	11	–	1	.917
Ohio State		–		–	9	–	1	.900
Dartmouth		–		–	16	–	2	.889
North Dakota		–		–	8	–	1	.889
Fordham		–		–	14	–	2	.875
Texas		–		–	7	–	1	.875
Baker		–		–	18	–	3	.857
Westminster (Pa.)		–		–	12	–	2	.857
Michigan State		–		–	11	–	2	.846
Bucknell		–		–	10	–	2	.833
Denison		–		–	10	–	2	.833
Montana State		–		–	5	–	1	.833
Williams		–		–	14	–	3	.824
Western Reserve		–		–	13	–	3	.813
Holy Cross		–		–	12	–	3	.800
Nebraska		–		–	12	–	3	.800
Virginia		–		–	8	–	2	.800
William & Mary		–		–	4	–	1	.800
Dayton		–		–	7	–	2	.778
Illinois State		–		–	6	–	2	.750
Syracuse		–		–	9	–	3	.750
Swarthmore		–		–	11	–	4	.733
Maine		–		–	10	–	4	.714
Springfield (Mass.)		–		–	10	–	4	.714
Allegheny		–		–	12	–	5	.706
Wooster		–		–	7	–	3	.700
Cincinnati		–		–	2	–	1	.667
Connecticut		–		–	6	–	3	.667
Grinnell		–		–	8	–	4	.667
Niagara		–		–	4	–	2	.667
Army		–		–	7	–	4	.636
Gettysburg		–		–	7	–	4	.636
Kansas		–		–	12	–	7	.632
Manhattan		–		–	6	–	4	.600
Mount Union		–		–	9	–	6	.600
Penn State		–		–	6	–	4	.600
Wesleyan (Conn.)		–		–	12	–	8	.600
Wyoming		–		–	3	–	2	.600
Canisius		–		–	10	–	7	.588
Washburn		–		–	10	–	7	.588
Idaho		–		–	4	–	3	.571
Lake Forest		–		–	9	–	7	.563
North Dakota Agricultural		–		–	5	–	4	.556
West Virginia		–		–	5	–	4	.556
Colorado		–		–	6	–	5	.545
Colgate		–		–	7	–	6	.538
Butler		–		–	1	–	1	.500
Colorado Agricultural		–		–	2	–	2	.500
Indiana State		–		–	6	–	6	.500
Lehigh		–		–	6	–	6	.500
Miami (Ohio)		–		–	3	–	3	.500
Nebraska Wesleyan		–		–	7	–	7	.500
New Mexico		–		–	2	–	2	.500
Wake Forest		–		–	3	–	3	.500
Washington State		–		–	5	–	5	.500
Akron		–		–	6	–	7	.462
Denver		–		–	6	–	7	.462
Bradley		–		–	4	–	5	.444
Delaware		–		–	3	–	4	.429
Temple		–		–	3	–	4	.429
Bloomsburg		–		–	2	–	3	.400
Trinity (N.C.)		–		–	2	–	3	.400
Kansas State		–		–	6	–	9	.400
Grove City		–		–	3	–	5	.375
Brown		–		–	4	–	7	.364
Kentucky		–		–	5	–	9	.357
Augustana (Ill.)		–		–	3	–	6	.333
Fairmount		–		–	2	–	4	.333
Wisconsin–Stevens Point		–		–	2	–	4	.333
Trinity (Conn.)		–		–	3	–	7	.300
Washington University		–		–	1	–	3	.250
Utah Agricultural		–		–	2	–	7	.222
CCNY		–		–	1	–	4	.200
Pittsburgh		–		–	2	–	9	.182
New Mexico A&M		–		–	0	–	1	.000
Oregon		–		–	0	–	5	.000

The 1905–06 Dartmouth Big Green men's basketball team represented Dartmouth College in intercollegiate basketball during the 1905–06 season. The team finished the season with a 16–2 record and were named national champions by the Helms Athletic Foundation. Player George Grebenstein was named a consensus All-American as well as the national player of the year at the end of the season.

== Schedule ==
Date time, TV	Rank^{#}	Opponent^{#}	Result	Record	Site city, state
Regular season
12/11/1905*		at Manhattan	W 42–31	1–0	The Bronx, NY
12/12/1905*		at Princeton	W 37–8	2–0	University Gymnasium; Princeton, NJ
12/13/1905*		at Columbia	W 16–10	3–0	Upper Manhattan, NY
12/16/1905*		MIT	W 30–2	4–0	Hanover, NH
1/13/1906*		at Holy Cross	W 31–21	5–0	Worcester, MA
1/15/1906*		Wesleyan	W 36–15	6–0	Hanover, NH
1/16/1906*		Wesleyan	W 39–24	7–0	Hanover, NH
1/23/1906*		Holy Cross	W 31–20	8–0	Hanover, NH
1/27/1906*		Colgate	L 27–32	8–1	Hanover, NH
2/3/1906*		Brown	W 48–19	9–1	Hanover, NH
2/22/1906*		at Wesleyan	W 22–20	10–1	Middletown, CT
2/22/1906*		at Wesleyan	L 17–28	10–2	Middletown, CT
2/23/1906*		at Hamilton	W 27–17	11–2	Clinton, NY
2/24/1906*		at Colgate	W 23–19	12–2	Hamilton, NY
2/26/1906*		at Williams	W 11–9	13–2	Williamstown, MA
3/3/1906*		Yale	W 44–16	14–2	Hanover, NH
3/7/1906*		Williams	W 26–7	15–2	Hanover, NH
3/8/1906*		at MIT	W 58–18	16–2	Cambridge, MA
*Non-conference game. ^{#}Rankings from AP Poll. (#) Tournament seedings in parentheses.
