= 1905–06 West Virginia Mountaineers men's basketball team =

American college basketball season

1905–06 West Virginia Mountaineers men's basketball
- Conference: Independent
- Record: 5–4
- Head coach: Anthony Chez (1st season)
- Captain: Shelby Taylor

1905–06 collegiate men's basketball independents standings
	Conf.				Overall
Team	W		L	PCT	W		L	PCT
Oregon Agricultural		–		–	10	–	0	1.000
Rhode Island A&M		–		–	5	–	0	1.000
Southwestern (Kan.)		–		–	6	–	0	1.000
Wabash		–		–	17	–	1	.944
Massachusetts Lowell		–		–	16	–	1	.941
Brigham Young		–		–	11	–	1	.917
Ohio State		–		–	9	–	1	.900
Dartmouth		–		–	16	–	2	.889
North Dakota		–		–	8	–	1	.889
Fordham		–		–	14	–	2	.875
Texas		–		–	7	–	1	.875
Baker		–		–	18	–	3	.857
Westminster (Pa.)		–		–	12	–	2	.857
Michigan State		–		–	11	–	2	.846
Bucknell		–		–	10	–	2	.833
Denison		–		–	10	–	2	.833
Montana State		–		–	5	–	1	.833
Williams		–		–	14	–	3	.824
Western Reserve		–		–	13	–	3	.813
Holy Cross		–		–	12	–	3	.800
Nebraska		–		–	12	–	3	.800
Virginia		–		–	8	–	2	.800
William & Mary		–		–	4	–	1	.800
Dayton		–		–	7	–	2	.778
Illinois State		–		–	6	–	2	.750
Syracuse		–		–	9	–	3	.750
Swarthmore		–		–	11	–	4	.733
Maine		–		–	10	–	4	.714
Springfield (Mass.)		–		–	10	–	4	.714
Allegheny		–		–	12	–	5	.706
Wooster		–		–	7	–	3	.700
Cincinnati		–		–	2	–	1	.667
Connecticut		–		–	6	–	3	.667
Grinnell		–		–	8	–	4	.667
Niagara		–		–	4	–	2	.667
Army		–		–	7	–	4	.636
Gettysburg		–		–	7	–	4	.636
Kansas		–		–	12	–	7	.632
Manhattan		–		–	6	–	4	.600
Mount Union		–		–	9	–	6	.600
Penn State		–		–	6	–	4	.600
Wesleyan (Conn.)		–		–	12	–	8	.600
Wyoming		–		–	3	–	2	.600
Canisius		–		–	10	–	7	.588
Washburn		–		–	10	–	7	.588
Idaho		–		–	4	–	3	.571
Lake Forest		–		–	9	–	7	.563
North Dakota Agricultural		–		–	5	–	4	.556
West Virginia		–		–	5	–	4	.556
Colorado		–		–	6	–	5	.545
Colgate		–		–	7	–	6	.538
Butler		–		–	1	–	1	.500
Colorado Agricultural		–		–	2	–	2	.500
Indiana State		–		–	6	–	6	.500
Lehigh		–		–	6	–	6	.500
Miami (Ohio)		–		–	3	–	3	.500
Nebraska Wesleyan		–		–	7	–	7	.500
New Mexico		–		–	2	–	2	.500
Wake Forest		–		–	3	–	3	.500
Washington State		–		–	5	–	5	.500
Akron		–		–	6	–	7	.462
Denver		–		–	6	–	7	.462
Bradley		–		–	4	–	5	.444
Delaware		–		–	3	–	4	.429
Temple		–		–	3	–	4	.429
Bloomsburg		–		–	2	–	3	.400
Trinity (N.C.)		–		–	2	–	3	.400
Kansas State		–		–	6	–	9	.400
Grove City		–		–	3	–	5	.375
Brown		–		–	4	–	7	.364
Kentucky		–		–	5	–	9	.357
Augustana (Ill.)		–		–	3	–	6	.333
Fairmount		–		–	2	–	4	.333
Wisconsin–Stevens Point		–		–	2	–	4	.333
Trinity (Conn.)		–		–	3	–	7	.300
Washington University		–		–	1	–	3	.250
Utah Agricultural		–		–	2	–	7	.222
CCNY		–		–	1	–	4	.200
Pittsburgh		–		–	2	–	9	.182
New Mexico A&M		–		–	0	–	1	.000
Oregon		–		–	0	–	5	.000

The 1905–06 West Virginia Mountaineers men's basketball team represented the University of West Virginia during the 1905–06 college men's basketball season. The team captain was Shelby Taylor.

== Schedule ==
Date time, TV	Opponent	Result	Record	Site city, state
January 13, 1906*	Waynesburg	W 43–13	1–0	Morgantown, WV
January 27, 1906*	Wilmerding YMCA	W 44–13	2–0	Morgantown, WV
February 9, 1905*	Independents	W 45–0	3–0	Morgantown, WV
February 14, 1905*	at Mount Union	L 20–44	3–1	Alliance, OH
February 15, 1906*	at Allegheny Prep. School	L 31–42	3–2	Meadville, PA
February 16, 1906*	at Wilmerding YMCA	L 18–37	3–3	Wilmerding, PA
February 17, 1906*	at W.U.P. (Pitt)	L 25–30	3–4	Duquesne Garden; Pittsburgh, PA
February 28, 1906*	East Liberty	W 37–15	4–4	Morgantown, WV
March 6, 1906*	Penn State	W 16–13	5–4	Morgantown, WV
*Non-conference game. (#) Tournament seedings in parentheses.
