= 1905–06 Oregon Agricultural Aggies men's basketball team =

American college basketball season

1905–06 Oregon Agricultural Aggies men's basketball
- Conference: Independent
- Record: 10–0
- Head coach: W. O. Trine (3rd season)

1905–06 collegiate men's basketball independents standings
	Conf.				Overall
Team	W		L	PCT	W		L	PCT
Oregon Agricultural		–		–	10	–	0	1.000
Rhode Island A&M		–		–	5	–	0	1.000
Southwestern (Kan.)		–		–	6	–	0	1.000
Wabash		–		–	17	–	1	.944
Massachusetts Lowell		–		–	16	–	1	.941
Brigham Young		–		–	11	–	1	.917
Ohio State		–		–	9	–	1	.900
Dartmouth		–		–	16	–	2	.889
North Dakota		–		–	8	–	1	.889
Fordham		–		–	14	–	2	.875
Texas		–		–	7	–	1	.875
Baker		–		–	18	–	3	.857
Westminster (Pa.)		–		–	12	–	2	.857
Michigan State		–		–	11	–	2	.846
Bucknell		–		–	10	–	2	.833
Denison		–		–	10	–	2	.833
Montana State		–		–	5	–	1	.833
Williams		–		–	14	–	3	.824
Western Reserve		–		–	13	–	3	.813
Holy Cross		–		–	12	–	3	.800
Nebraska		–		–	12	–	3	.800
Virginia		–		–	8	–	2	.800
William & Mary		–		–	4	–	1	.800
Dayton		–		–	7	–	2	.778
Illinois State		–		–	6	–	2	.750
Syracuse		–		–	9	–	3	.750
Swarthmore		–		–	11	–	4	.733
Maine		–		–	10	–	4	.714
Springfield (Mass.)		–		–	10	–	4	.714
Allegheny		–		–	12	–	5	.706
Wooster		–		–	7	–	3	.700
Cincinnati		–		–	2	–	1	.667
Connecticut		–		–	6	–	3	.667
Grinnell		–		–	8	–	4	.667
Niagara		–		–	4	–	2	.667
Army		–		–	7	–	4	.636
Gettysburg		–		–	7	–	4	.636
Kansas		–		–	12	–	7	.632
Manhattan		–		–	6	–	4	.600
Mount Union		–		–	9	–	6	.600
Penn State		–		–	6	–	4	.600
Wesleyan (Conn.)		–		–	12	–	8	.600
Wyoming		–		–	3	–	2	.600
Canisius		–		–	10	–	7	.588
Washburn		–		–	10	–	7	.588
Idaho		–		–	4	–	3	.571
Lake Forest		–		–	9	–	7	.563
North Dakota Agricultural		–		–	5	–	4	.556
West Virginia		–		–	5	–	4	.556
Colorado		–		–	6	–	5	.545
Colgate		–		–	7	–	6	.538
Butler		–		–	1	–	1	.500
Colorado Agricultural		–		–	2	–	2	.500
Indiana State		–		–	6	–	6	.500
Lehigh		–		–	6	–	6	.500
Miami (Ohio)		–		–	3	–	3	.500
Nebraska Wesleyan		–		–	7	–	7	.500
New Mexico		–		–	2	–	2	.500
Wake Forest		–		–	3	–	3	.500
Washington State		–		–	5	–	5	.500
Akron		–		–	6	–	7	.462
Denver		–		–	6	–	7	.462
Bradley		–		–	4	–	5	.444
Delaware		–		–	3	–	4	.429
Temple		–		–	3	–	4	.429
Bloomsburg		–		–	2	–	3	.400
Trinity (N.C.)		–		–	2	–	3	.400
Kansas State		–		–	6	–	9	.400
Grove City		–		–	3	–	5	.375
Brown		–		–	4	–	7	.364
Kentucky		–		–	5	–	9	.357
Augustana (Ill.)		–		–	3	–	6	.333
Fairmount		–		–	2	–	4	.333
Wisconsin–Stevens Point		–		–	2	–	4	.333
Trinity (Conn.)		–		–	3	–	7	.300
Washington University		–		–	1	–	3	.250
Utah Agricultural		–		–	2	–	7	.222
CCNY		–		–	1	–	4	.200
Pittsburgh		–		–	2	–	9	.182
New Mexico A&M		–		–	0	–	1	.000
Oregon		–		–	0	–	5	.000

The 1905-06 Oregon Agricultural College men's basketball team was the fifth in the history of the school, known today as Oregon State University. The team played ten games in the year, winning every contest, a record which allowed supporters of the team to proclaim them champions of the state of Oregon.

The nickname of OAC teams in this era was the "Aggies," with today's team name, the "Beavers" first adopted during the decade of the 1920s. The team was independent, scheduling games on an ad hoc basis rather than as part of a formal sports conference.

== Team history ==
As the season came to a close at the end of March 1906, the Corvallis Gazette recounted the Aggies' undefeated season with a front-page story for its readers.

"...Never before in the history of sports at OAC did a team close the season with such a splendid record behind them. By a system of clean, honorable playing, Captain Cate's bunch have been able to bring the state championship to the college on the hill.

"During the previous seasons there had been some doubt as to the real championship team, but this year there can be no misunderstanding. OAC has not only defeated every other team, but in the return games the orange were always victors. The Farmers won every game on the schedule, which gives them the title of champions."

== Roster ==
=== Starters ===
- Reed (forward)
- Swan (forward)
- Cate (center — captain)
- Rooper (guard)
- Bilyeu (guard)

== Game results ==
- OAC 33, Salem YMCA 7
- OAC 23, OSNS 16
- OAC 17, University of Oregon 15
- OAC 18, Dallas 17
- OAC 21, Willamette University 7
- OAC 25, Minnesota Red Men 21
- OAC 17, Dallas 11
- OAC 27, Chicago Meteors 20
- OAC 63, Ashland 21

Source: Corvallis Gazette, March 27, 1906, p. 1.
