= 1905–06 Butler Christians men's basketball team =

American college basketball season

1905–06 Butler Bulldogs men's basketball
- Conference: Independent
- Record: 1–1
- Head coach: Edgar Wingard (2nd season)

1905–06 collegiate men's basketball independents standings
| | Conf. | | | | Overall |
| Team | W | | L | PCT | W | | L | PCT |
|---|---|---|---|---|---|---|---|---|
| Oregon Agricultural | | – | | – | 10 | – | 0 | 1.000 |
| Rhode Island A&M | | – | | – | 5 | – | 0 | 1.000 |
| Southwestern (Kan.) | | – | | – | 6 | – | 0 | 1.000 |
| Wabash | | – | | – | 17 | – | 1 | .944 |
| Massachusetts Lowell | | – | | – | 16 | – | 1 | .941 |
| Brigham Young | | – | | – | 11 | – | 1 | .917 |
| Ohio State | | – | | – | 9 | – | 1 | .900 |
| Dartmouth | | – | | – | 16 | – | 2 | .889 |
| North Dakota | | – | | – | 8 | – | 1 | .889 |
| Fordham | | – | | – | 14 | – | 2 | .875 |
| Texas | | – | | – | 7 | – | 1 | .875 |
| Baker | | – | | – | 18 | – | 3 | .857 |
| Westminster (Pa.) | | – | | – | 12 | – | 2 | .857 |
| Michigan State | | – | | – | 11 | – | 2 | .846 |
| Bucknell | | – | | – | 10 | – | 2 | .833 |
| Denison | | – | | – | 10 | – | 2 | .833 |
| Montana State | | – | | – | 5 | – | 1 | .833 |
| Williams | | – | | – | 14 | – | 3 | .824 |
| Western Reserve | | – | | – | 13 | – | 3 | .813 |
| Holy Cross | | – | | – | 12 | – | 3 | .800 |
| Nebraska | | – | | – | 12 | – | 3 | .800 |
| Virginia | | – | | – | 8 | – | 2 | .800 |
| William & Mary | | – | | – | 4 | – | 1 | .800 |
| Dayton | | – | | – | 7 | – | 2 | .778 |
| Illinois State | | – | | – | 6 | – | 2 | .750 |
| Syracuse | | – | | – | 9 | – | 3 | .750 |
| Swarthmore | | – | | – | 11 | – | 4 | .733 |
| Maine | | – | | – | 10 | – | 4 | .714 |
| Springfield (Mass.) | | – | | – | 10 | – | 4 | .714 |
| Allegheny | | – | | – | 12 | – | 5 | .706 |
| Wooster | | – | | – | 7 | – | 3 | .700 |
| Cincinnati | | – | | – | 2 | – | 1 | .667 |
| Connecticut | | – | | – | 6 | – | 3 | .667 |
| Grinnell | | – | | – | 8 | – | 4 | .667 |
| Niagara | | – | | – | 4 | – | 2 | .667 |
| Army | | – | | – | 7 | – | 4 | .636 |
| Gettysburg | | – | | – | 7 | – | 4 | .636 |
| Kansas | | – | | – | 12 | – | 7 | .632 |
| Manhattan | | – | | – | 6 | – | 4 | .600 |
| Mount Union | | – | | – | 9 | – | 6 | .600 |
| Penn State | | – | | – | 6 | – | 4 | .600 |
| Wesleyan (Conn.) | | – | | – | 12 | – | 8 | .600 |
| Wyoming | | – | | – | 3 | – | 2 | .600 |
| Canisius | | – | | – | 10 | – | 7 | .588 |
| Washburn | | – | | – | 10 | – | 7 | .588 |
| Idaho | | – | | – | 4 | – | 3 | .571 |
| Lake Forest | | – | | – | 9 | – | 7 | .563 |
| North Dakota Agricultural | | – | | – | 5 | – | 4 | .556 |
| West Virginia | | – | | – | 5 | – | 4 | .556 |
| Colorado | | – | | – | 6 | – | 5 | .545 |
| Colgate | | – | | – | 7 | – | 6 | .538 |
| Butler | | – | | – | 1 | – | 1 | .500 |
| Colorado Agricultural | | – | | – | 2 | – | 2 | .500 |
| Indiana State | | – | | – | 6 | – | 6 | .500 |
| Lehigh | | – | | – | 6 | – | 6 | .500 |
| Miami (Ohio) | | – | | – | 3 | – | 3 | .500 |
| Nebraska Wesleyan | | – | | – | 7 | – | 7 | .500 |
| New Mexico | | – | | – | 2 | – | 2 | .500 |
| Wake Forest | | – | | – | 3 | – | 3 | .500 |
| Washington State | | – | | – | 5 | – | 5 | .500 |
| Akron | | – | | – | 6 | – | 7 | .462 |
| Denver | | – | | – | 6 | – | 7 | .462 |
| Bradley | | – | | – | 4 | – | 5 | .444 |
| Delaware | | – | | – | 3 | – | 4 | .429 |
| Temple | | – | | – | 3 | – | 4 | .429 |
| Bloomsburg | | – | | – | 2 | – | 3 | .400 |
| Trinity (N.C.) | | – | | – | 2 | – | 3 | .400 |
| Kansas State | | – | | – | 6 | – | 9 | .400 |
| Grove City | | – | | – | 3 | – | 5 | .375 |
| Brown | | – | | – | 4 | – | 7 | .364 |
| Kentucky | | – | | – | 5 | – | 9 | .357 |
| Augustana (Ill.) | | – | | – | 3 | – | 6 | .333 |
| Fairmount | | – | | – | 2 | – | 4 | .333 |
| Wisconsin–Stevens Point | | – | | – | 2 | – | 4 | .333 |
| Trinity (Conn.) | | – | | – | 3 | – | 7 | .300 |
| Washington University | | – | | – | 1 | – | 3 | .250 |
| Utah Agricultural | | – | | – | 2 | – | 7 | .222 |
| CCNY | | – | | – | 1 | – | 4 | .200 |
| Pittsburgh | | – | | – | 2 | – | 9 | .182 |
| New Mexico A&M | | – | | – | 0 | – | 1 | .000 |
| Oregon | | – | | – | 0 | – | 5 | .000 |

The 1905–06 Butler Christians men's basketball team represented Butler University during the 1905–06 college men's basketball season. The head coach was Walter Kelly, coaching in his second season with the Christians.

== Schedule ==
| Date time, TV | Opponent | Result | Record | Site city, state |
|---|---|---|---|---|
| * | Shortridge High School | W 18–8 | 1–0 | Indianapolis, IN |
| January 9, 1906* | at Indiana | L 11–42 | 1–1 | Old Assembly Hall; Bloomington, IN |
*Non-conference game. (#) Tournament seedings in parentheses.
