= 1905–06 Trinity Blue and White men's basketball team =

American college basketball season

1905–06 Trinity Blue and White men's basketball
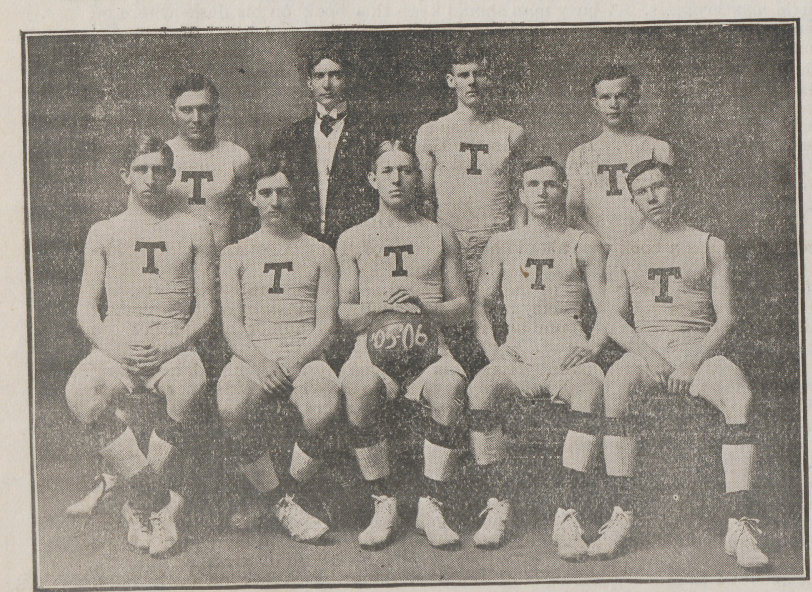
- Team picture of the Trinity (now Duke) Basketball team 1905-1906
- Conference: Independent
- Record: 2–3
- Head coach: Wilbur Wade Card (1st season)
- Captain: Thad Stem
- Home arena: Angier B Duke Gymnasium

1905–06 collegiate men's basketball independents standings
	Conf.				Overall
Team	W		L	PCT	W		L	PCT
Oregon Agricultural		–		–	10	–	0	1.000
Rhode Island A&M		–		–	5	–	0	1.000
Southwestern (Kan.)		–		–	6	–	0	1.000
Wabash		–		–	17	–	1	.944
Massachusetts Lowell		–		–	16	–	1	.941
Brigham Young		–		–	11	–	1	.917
Ohio State		–		–	9	–	1	.900
Dartmouth		–		–	16	–	2	.889
North Dakota		–		–	8	–	1	.889
Fordham		–		–	14	–	2	.875
Texas		–		–	7	–	1	.875
Baker		–		–	18	–	3	.857
Westminster (Pa.)		–		–	12	–	2	.857
Michigan State		–		–	11	–	2	.846
Bucknell		–		–	10	–	2	.833
Denison		–		–	10	–	2	.833
Montana State		–		–	5	–	1	.833
Williams		–		–	14	–	3	.824
Western Reserve		–		–	13	–	3	.813
Holy Cross		–		–	12	–	3	.800
Nebraska		–		–	12	–	3	.800
Virginia		–		–	8	–	2	.800
William & Mary		–		–	4	–	1	.800
Dayton		–		–	7	–	2	.778
Illinois State		–		–	6	–	2	.750
Syracuse		–		–	9	–	3	.750
Swarthmore		–		–	11	–	4	.733
Maine		–		–	10	–	4	.714
Springfield (Mass.)		–		–	10	–	4	.714
Allegheny		–		–	12	–	5	.706
Wooster		–		–	7	–	3	.700
Cincinnati		–		–	2	–	1	.667
Connecticut		–		–	6	–	3	.667
Grinnell		–		–	8	–	4	.667
Niagara		–		–	4	–	2	.667
Army		–		–	7	–	4	.636
Gettysburg		–		–	7	–	4	.636
Kansas		–		–	12	–	7	.632
Manhattan		–		–	6	–	4	.600
Mount Union		–		–	9	–	6	.600
Penn State		–		–	6	–	4	.600
Wesleyan (Conn.)		–		–	12	–	8	.600
Wyoming		–		–	3	–	2	.600
Canisius		–		–	10	–	7	.588
Washburn		–		–	10	–	7	.588
Idaho		–		–	4	–	3	.571
Lake Forest		–		–	9	–	7	.563
North Dakota Agricultural		–		–	5	–	4	.556
West Virginia		–		–	5	–	4	.556
Colorado		–		–	6	–	5	.545
Colgate		–		–	7	–	6	.538
Butler		–		–	1	–	1	.500
Colorado Agricultural		–		–	2	–	2	.500
Indiana State		–		–	6	–	6	.500
Lehigh		–		–	6	–	6	.500
Miami (Ohio)		–		–	3	–	3	.500
Nebraska Wesleyan		–		–	7	–	7	.500
New Mexico		–		–	2	–	2	.500
Wake Forest		–		–	3	–	3	.500
Washington State		–		–	5	–	5	.500
Akron		–		–	6	–	7	.462
Denver		–		–	6	–	7	.462
Bradley		–		–	4	–	5	.444
Delaware		–		–	3	–	4	.429
Temple		–		–	3	–	4	.429
Bloomsburg		–		–	2	–	3	.400
Trinity (N.C.)		–		–	2	–	3	.400
Kansas State		–		–	6	–	9	.400
Grove City		–		–	3	–	5	.375
Brown		–		–	4	–	7	.364
Kentucky		–		–	5	–	9	.357
Augustana (Ill.)		–		–	3	–	6	.333
Fairmount		–		–	2	–	4	.333
Wisconsin–Stevens Point		–		–	2	–	4	.333
Trinity (Conn.)		–		–	3	–	7	.300
Washington University		–		–	1	–	3	.250
Utah Agricultural		–		–	2	–	7	.222
CCNY		–		–	1	–	4	.200
Pittsburgh		–		–	2	–	9	.182
New Mexico A&M		–		–	0	–	1	.000
Oregon		–		–	0	–	5	.000

The 1905–06 Trinity Blue and White's basketball team represented Trinity College (later renamed Duke University) during the 1905–06 men's college basketball season.

== Schedule ==
Date time, TV	Opponent	Result	Record	Site city, state
March 2*	at Wake Forest	L 10-24	0-1	Angier B Duke Gymnasium; Durham, NC
March 14*	at Wake Forest	L 5-15	0-2	Campus gymnasium Wake Forest, NC
March 19*	at Trinity Park	W 28-18	1-2	Angier B Duke Gymnasium; Durham, NC
March 22*	at Trinity Park	L 16-19	1-3	Angier B Duke Gymnasium; Durham, NC
March 26*	at Trinity Park	W 19-13	2–3	Angier B Duke Gymnasium; Durham, NC
*Non-conference game. (#) Tournament seedings in parentheses.

== Players ==
Name	Position	Height	Weight
Garland Greever	Forward	5'8"	140
C R Claywell	Forward	5'9"	155
Thad Stem (captain)	Center and guard	5'11.5"	180
L G White	Guard	5'6"	135
C R Pugh	Guard	5'7.5"	170
T M Grant	Guard	5'11"	155
T A Holton	Forward	5'7"	140
B S Womble	Center	6'0"	165

== Scoring statistics ==
Name	Games	FG made	FT made	Fouls	PPG
Garland Greever	5	12	9	5	6.6
C R Claywell	5	8	0	4	3.2
Thad Stem	5	1	14	8	3.2
L G White	5	3	0	14	1.2
B S Womble	4	3	0	4	1.5
T M Grant	2	1	0	1	1.0
C R Pugh	1	0	0	0	0.0
T A Holton	1	0	0	0	0.0
