= 1905–06 Kentucky Wildcats men's basketball team =

1905–06 season of University of Kentucky men's basketball team

1905–06 Kentucky Wildcats men's basketball
- Conference: Independent
- Record: 5–9
- Head coach: Unnamed (2nd season)
- Home arena: State College Gymnasium

1905–06 collegiate men's basketball independents standings
	Conf.				Overall
Team	W		L	PCT	W		L	PCT
Oregon Agricultural		–		–	10	–	0	1.000
Rhode Island A&M		–		–	5	–	0	1.000
Southwestern (Kan.)		–		–	6	–	0	1.000
Wabash		–		–	17	–	1	.944
Massachusetts Lowell		–		–	16	–	1	.941
Brigham Young		–		–	11	–	1	.917
Ohio State		–		–	9	–	1	.900
Dartmouth		–		–	16	–	2	.889
North Dakota		–		–	8	–	1	.889
Fordham		–		–	14	–	2	.875
Texas		–		–	7	–	1	.875
Baker		–		–	18	–	3	.857
Westminster (Pa.)		–		–	12	–	2	.857
Michigan State		–		–	11	–	2	.846
Bucknell		–		–	10	–	2	.833
Denison		–		–	10	–	2	.833
Montana State		–		–	5	–	1	.833
Williams		–		–	14	–	3	.824
Western Reserve		–		–	13	–	3	.813
Holy Cross		–		–	12	–	3	.800
Nebraska		–		–	12	–	3	.800
Virginia		–		–	8	–	2	.800
William & Mary		–		–	4	–	1	.800
Dayton		–		–	7	–	2	.778
Illinois State		–		–	6	–	2	.750
Syracuse		–		–	9	–	3	.750
Swarthmore		–		–	11	–	4	.733
Maine		–		–	10	–	4	.714
Springfield (Mass.)		–		–	10	–	4	.714
Allegheny		–		–	12	–	5	.706
Wooster		–		–	7	–	3	.700
Cincinnati		–		–	2	–	1	.667
Connecticut		–		–	6	–	3	.667
Grinnell		–		–	8	–	4	.667
Niagara		–		–	4	–	2	.667
Army		–		–	7	–	4	.636
Gettysburg		–		–	7	–	4	.636
Kansas		–		–	12	–	7	.632
Manhattan		–		–	6	–	4	.600
Mount Union		–		–	9	–	6	.600
Penn State		–		–	6	–	4	.600
Wesleyan (Conn.)		–		–	12	–	8	.600
Wyoming		–		–	3	–	2	.600
Canisius		–		–	10	–	7	.588
Washburn		–		–	10	–	7	.588
Idaho		–		–	4	–	3	.571
Lake Forest		–		–	9	–	7	.563
North Dakota Agricultural		–		–	5	–	4	.556
West Virginia		–		–	5	–	4	.556
Colorado		–		–	6	–	5	.545
Colgate		–		–	7	–	6	.538
Butler		–		–	1	–	1	.500
Colorado Agricultural		–		–	2	–	2	.500
Indiana State		–		–	6	–	6	.500
Lehigh		–		–	6	–	6	.500
Miami (Ohio)		–		–	3	–	3	.500
Nebraska Wesleyan		–		–	7	–	7	.500
New Mexico		–		–	2	–	2	.500
Wake Forest		–		–	3	–	3	.500
Washington State		–		–	5	–	5	.500
Akron		–		–	6	–	7	.462
Denver		–		–	6	–	7	.462
Bradley		–		–	4	–	5	.444
Delaware		–		–	3	–	4	.429
Temple		–		–	3	–	4	.429
Bloomsburg		–		–	2	–	3	.400
Trinity (N.C.)		–		–	2	–	3	.400
Kansas State		–		–	6	–	9	.400
Grove City		–		–	3	–	5	.375
Brown		–		–	4	–	7	.364
Kentucky		–		–	5	–	9	.357
Augustana (Ill.)		–		–	3	–	6	.333
Fairmount		–		–	2	–	4	.333
Wisconsin–Stevens Point		–		–	2	–	4	.333
Trinity (Conn.)		–		–	3	–	7	.300
Washington University		–		–	1	–	3	.250
Utah Agricultural		–		–	2	–	7	.222
CCNY		–		–	1	–	4	.200
Pittsburgh		–		–	2	–	9	.182
New Mexico A&M		–		–	0	–	1	.000
Oregon		–		–	0	–	5	.000

The 1905–06 Kentucky State men's basketball team competed on behalf of the University of Kentucky during the 1905–06 season. They held a winning record after five games, going 3–2, for the first time in their history. Afterwards, however, they would lose 7 of 9 of the rest of their games to finish 5–9.

== Roster ==
1904–05 Kentucky Wildcats men's basketball team
Players
Coaches

Pos.	#	Name	Height	Weight	Year	Previous school	Hometown
F		Stanley Baer	5 ft 6 in (1.68 m)	128 lb (58 kg)	Jr	Unknown	Louisville, Kentucky
G		Don Branson	—	—	Jr	Unknown	Yosemite, Kentucky
G		Arthur Donan	—	190 lb (86 kg)	Jr	Unknown	Horse Cave, Kentucky
		Joseph Hermann	5 ft 11 in (1.8 m)	185 lb (84 kg)	Jr	Unknown	Newport, Kentucky
C		Thomas Bryant	6 ft 0 in (1.83 m)	—	So	Kentucky State College Prep School	Nicholasville, Kentucky
G		Maury Wilson	5 ft 10 in (1.78 m)	148 lb (67 kg)	So	Louisville Male High School	Louisville, Kentucky
G		Richard Barbee	5 ft 8 in (1.73 m)	152 lb (69 kg)	Fr	Unknown	Lexington, Kentucky

Head coach

- Unnamed

Assistant coach(es)

{{{asst_coach}}}

Legend

- (C) Team captain
- (S) Suspended
- (I) Ineligible
- (W) Walk-on
- Injured
- Current redshirt

== Schedule ==
Date time, TV	Rank^{#}	Opponent^{#}	Result	Record	Site city, state
Regular Season
1/11/1906*		Kentucky University (now Transylvania)	W Unrecorded	1–0	Kentucky University; Lexington, KY
1/12/1906*		Miami (OH)	L 10–15	1–1	State College Gymnasium; Lexington, KY
1/19/1906*		Centre	W 15–14	2–1	State College Gymnasium; Lexington, KY
1/20/1906*		Georgetown College	W 34–9	2–2	Georgetown College; Georgetown, KY
1/26/1906*		Centre	W 17–15	3–2	Central University; Danville, KY
1/27/1906*		Cincinnati YMCA	L 16–23	3–3	State College Gymnasium University; Lexington, KY
2/3/1906*		Christ Church Cincinnati	L 24–38	3–4	State College Gymnasium University; Lexington, KY
2/9/1906*		Georgetown College	L 22–28	3–5	State College Gymnasium University; Lexington, KY
2/12/1906*		New Albany YMCA	L 12–29	3–6	New Albany; New Albany, IN
2/13/1906*		North Vernon	W 34–14	4–6	North Vernon; North Vernon, IN
2/14/1906*		Moores Hill	W 32–11	5–6	Moores Hill; Moores Hill, IN
2/15/1906*		Christ Church Cincinnati	L 17–54	5–7	Christ Church Cincinnati; Cincinnati, OH
2/16/1906*		Cincinnati	L 9-38	5–8	Cincinnati; Cincinnati, OH
2/17/1906*		Miami (OH)	L 19–29	5–9	Miami (OH); Oxford, OH
*Non-conference game. ^{#}Rankings from AP Poll. (#) Tournament seedings in parentheses.
