= Rufus Sisson =

American basketball player

Personal information
- Born: September 11, 1890
- Died: March 1977 (aged 86) Potsdam, New York

Career information
- College: Dartmouth (1909–1912)

Career highlights
- Consensus All-American (1912); EIBL scoring champion (1912)

Rufus Sisson (September 11, 1890 – March 1977) was an All-American basketball player at Dartmouth College in 1911–12. He led the Eastern Intercollegiate Basketball League in scoring at 12.8 points per game in 10 games played. He was the first Dartmouth player to lead the league in scoring, and only the second All-American (George Grebenstein was named an All-American in 1906).
