= Victor Cicero Kays =

- Born: July 24, 1882; Magnolia, Illinois, U.S.
- Died: January 20, 1966 (aged 83); Jonesboro, Arkansas, U.S.
- Resting place: Jonesboro Memorial Park Cemetery, Jonesboro, Arkansas, U.S.
- Known for: Founding President of Arkansas State University; Founder of the Kays Foundation
- Spouse: Bertie Hale (m. 1917; died 1966)
- Children: 1

Victor Cicero Kays (July 7, 1882 – January 20, 1966) was an American educator, coach and the founding president of Arkansas State University, originally known as the First District State Agricultural School of Arkansas. Kays was the driving force behind the conversion of a regional agricultural training school in Jonesboro, Arkansas into a four-year university. The transformation was successful even through the country's battle with The Great Depression and two world wars.

== Early life ==
Kays was born on July 24, 1882, in Magnolia, Illinois. The son of farmers, John A. Kays and Mary Alice Kays, Victor had five siblings. Upon graduating high school from Henry, Illinois, Kays studied for three years at Northern Illinois State Teachers College and was student coach for the school's first football team before completing a bachelor's degree in 1902. Kays advanced his education at the University of Illinois, where he was a member of the very first Illinois Fighting Illini men's basketball team. While at Illinois he earned a second bachelor's degree, in science, in 1906. After finishing school, his first job was teaching and coaching at the Savanna High School in Savanna, Illinois, but he also worked on the family farm. Due to his poor health, which prevented his continued work on the farm, he resumed his higher education degrees by attending New Mexico A&M College, where he completed bachelor's and master's degrees in agriculture in 1909 and then worked as an experiment station laboratory chemist in Mesilla Park, New Mexico.

== Academic career ==
Upon the completion of his master's degree in New Mexico, Kays became the director of an agricultural school in Wetumpka, Alabama. During his time in Alabama, he met Arkansas state senator Charles E. Bush of Antioch and, with his motivation, he helped Kays become the principal for the First District agricultural school. This school was one of four throughout the state established by the Arkansas General Assembly through Act 100 in 1909. On June 1, 1910, Kays took the reins of the school, and on October 3, 1910 he and his newly hired faculty, welcomed 189 students for the first day of classes.

Initially, the classes of the First District State Agricultural School of Arkansas met in rented quarters upstairs in a downtown Jonesboro building while the new agricultural school and two residence halls were being built on a 442-acre plot of farmland east of town. As Kays nurtured the young institution and its growing student body, he emphasized instruction in advanced farming methods, such as crop rotation. He was instrumental in acquiring the first herd of Holstein dairy cattle in the state with the intent of utilizing them, and not only for training the students in livestock farming, but for providing dairy products to the campus residents.

In 1915, the Arkansas General Assembly appointed an investigating committee to examine the performance of the agricultural schools. The committee's report praised the school facilities and its leader, saying, "We find Professor Kays a most excellent gentleman, of indispensable value as the head of such a school....The only deplorable fact in regard to his service to the state is that he is paid a mere pittance for his services." Besides his leadership in academic and financial matters, Kays was known as a "hands-on" president who was just as likely to be helping with the construction of a campus building or reviewing student behavior in the residence halls as performing his traditional duties.

Initially, in 1918 the school started offering a two-year college-level program and was known as the First District State Agricultural School of Arkansas. It was renamed First District Agricultural and Mechanical College in 1925 and attained accreditation by the North Central Association of Colleges and Secondary Schools in 1928. By 1930, the college began offering a four-year degree program, but a major setback occurred the following year when fire destroyed the main building that housed all classrooms and offices. In order to maintain, all classes met in the campus dairy barn as well as other alternate quarters the next day. Kays immediately began formulating plans for a replacement facility that was completed within the following year. Known as Robert E. Lee Wilson Hall, named for the patron Wilson family of Mississippi County, it was dedicated in November 1932. In 1933, the Arkansas General Assembly renamed the institution Arkansas State College.

During her time as a U.S. Senator, Hattie Caraway of Jonesboro was often called upon by Kays with the intent of strengthening his academic programs and help with securing federal government funding for construction and special projects. During their collaboration, they were credited not only for adding at least nine buildings across the campus, but for establishing military training schools on campus in support of the war effort.

== Personal life ==
Kays married Bertie Hale of Paragould (Greene County) on June 12, 1917, and they had a son, Victor Hale Kays. In 1936, Kays and his wife built a Tudor-style residence on Aggie Road, across from the campus, where they lived during the last seven years of his presidency and the remainder of his life. This house is now known as the Victor Cicero Kays House. Beyond the classroom, Kays formed a charitable foundation, the Arkansas State College Foundation, to assist with institutional finances. What is today known as Kays Foundation is still actively supporting Arkansas State University.

== Later life ==
After retiring as president in January 1943, Kays was named president emeritus and retained as business manager. After his successor's resignation in 1945, he served as acting president for nearly a year. The board of trustees of Arkansas State College awarded Kays an honorary doctor of laws degree on May 25, 1956. The citation summarized his contributions to the college's early success and cited his leadership that promoted "educational opportunities and advantages to the rural, as well as the city youth, of Arkansas." Following a brief illness, Kays died in Jonesboro on January 20, 1966, and was buried at Jonesboro Memorial Park Cemetery.
