= Otto Stangel =

American basketball player

Personal information
- Born: March 23, 1889 Tisch Mills, Wisconsin, U.S.
- Died: March 29, 1956 (aged 67) St. Cloud, Minnesota, U.S.

Career information
- College: Wisconsin (1910–1912)
- Position: Forward

Career highlights
- Helms Foundation Player of the Year (1912); Helms All-American (1912); All-Big Ten (1912); Helms national champion (1912)

Otto A. Stangel (March 23, 1889 – March 29, 1956), a native of Two Rivers, Wisconsin, was an NCAA Men's Basketball All-American basketball player at the University of Wisconsin–Madison in 1911–12. He led the Big Ten Conference in scoring with 177 points, a record which stood for eight years. The Badgers went undefeated in 1911–12 at 15–0 and were named co-Big Ten champions as well as retroactively-named national champions by the Helms Athletic Foundation. Helms also named Stangel an All-American in 1912.

Stangel was later the superintendent of farms at Delaware Valley University and the school's football coach in 1923.

== Additional sources ==
1. Anderson, Dave (2006). University of Wisconsin Basketball (PDF). Arcadia Publishing. p. 16. ISBN 9780738541211.
2. Kopriva, Don; Mott, Jim (1998). On Wisconsin!: The History of Badger Athletics (PDF). Sports Publishing Inc. p. 26. ISBN 9781571670380.
