= Victor Cicero Kays House =

Historic house in Arkansas, United States

- U.S. National Register of Historic Places
- Location within Arkansas Location within the United States
- Location: 2506 Aggie Rd., Jonesboro, Arkansas
- Coordinates: 35°50′33″N 90°40′26″W
- Area: less than one acre
- NRHP reference No.: 14000246
- Added to NRHP: May 23, 2014

The Victor Cicero Kays House is a historic house at 2506 Aggie Road, on the campus of Arkansas State University in Jonesboro, Arkansas. It is a 2 1/2-story structure, designed by Arthur N. McAninch and built in 1936 for Victor Cicero Kays, the first president of the university. It is also locally notable as a fine example of Tudor Revival architecture, with a brick first floor, and the second finished in brick and half-timbered stucco. The roof is finished in green tile.

The house was listed on the National Register of Historic Places in 2014.

== See also ==
- National Register of Historic Places listings in Craighead County, Arkansas
