= Claus Benson =

American basketball player (born 1889)

Personal information
- Born: November 15, 1889 New York City, New York, U.S.

Career information
- High school: Horace Mann (New York City)
- College: Columbia (1909–1912)
- Position: Guard

Career history

Coaching
- 1919–1920: Columbia
- 192?–1925?: Army (assistant)

Career highlights
- Consensus All-American (1912); First-team all-EIBL (1912); Second-team all-EIBL (1911)

Claus Dascher "Babe" Benson (November 15, 1889 – ?) was an American basketball player known for his collegiate career at Columbia University in the 1910s. He led the Lions to back-to-back Eastern Intercollegiate Basketball League (EIBL) championships in 1910–11 and 1911–12 and was named all-conference both seasons. As a senior in 1911–12 Benson was named an NCAA All-American by the Helms Athletic Foundation.

Benson served in World War I and returned to his alma mater to coach Columbia for one season (1919–20). He recorded a 4–10 overall record. Benson also served as an assistant coach at Army after Columbia.
