= 1906 NCAA Men's Basketball All-Americans =

- Awarded for: 1905–06 collegiate men's basketball season

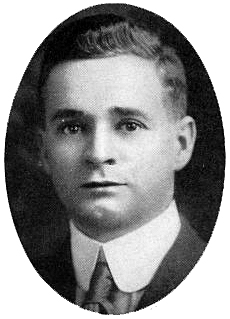
George Flint of Pennsylvania.

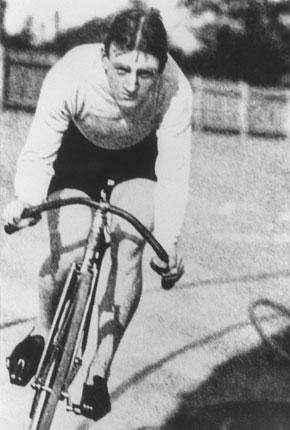
Marcus Hurley of Columbia.

The 1906 College Basketball All-American team, as chosen retroactively by the Helms Athletic Foundation. The player highlighted in gold was chosen as the Helms Foundation College Basketball Player of the Year retroactively in 1944.

Player	Team
Harold Amberg	Harvard
Garfield Brown	Minnesota
Eugene Cowell	Williams
George Flint	Penn
George Grebenstein	Dartmouth
Ralph Griffiths	Harvard
Marcus Hurley	Columbia
Charles Keinath	Penn
James McKeag	Chicago
John Schommer	Chicago

== See also ==
- 1905–06 collegiate men's basketball season in the United States
