= Shorty Ray =

American football executive (1884–1956)

Profile
- Positions: Technical Advisor on the Rules, Supervisor of Officials

Personal information
- Born: September 21, 1884; Highland Park, Illinois, U.S.
- Died: September 16, 1956 (aged 71)

Career information
- College: University of Illinois
- Pro Football Hall of Fame (Class of 1966)

Hugh Light "Shorty" Ray (September 21, 1884 – September 16, 1956) was an American professional football official. He was the first technical advisor on the rules and supervisor of officials for the National Football League (NFL) from 1938 to 1952. He was inducted into the Pro Football Hall of Fame in 1966.

== Early life and college ==
Ray was born in Highland Park, Illinois, in 1884. He was the son of John Thompson Ray and Emily S. (Light) Ray. He attended the Crane Manual Training High School in Chicago. He began his college education at Lewis Institute (now part of the Illinois Institute of Technology) from 1901 to 1903. He next attended the University of Illinois where he received a Bachelor of Science degree in mechanical engineering. He played baseball, football, and basketball at Illinois and was captain of the 1905–06 Illinois Fighting Illini men's basketball team. Ray also reportedly beat University of Chicago football star Walter Eckersall in a 100-yard dash while attending Illinois. According to his biography at the Pro Football Hall of Fame, Ray was five feet, six inches tall and weighed only 136 pounds.

== Teaching and officiating career ==
After graduating from the University of Illinois, Ray served as the athletic director at the Smith Academy in St. Louis from 1907 to 1908. In 1909, he was hired as a mechanical drawing instructor at Wendell Phillips High School in Chicago. He continued teaching mechanical drawing in Chicago high schools for more than 30 years.

In addition to his work as a teacher, Ray worked as a football official in Big Ten Conference games in the 1920s and 1930s. He also officiated in basketball and baseball games.

Ray helped organize the Athletic Officials Association (AOA) and organized rules clinics and written tests that were mandatory for members of the AOA. He was also the author of the high school football code and invented and copyrighted the "Play Situation Book" now called the "Case Book." The "Play Situations Book" taught officials, coaches, and players the rules through example and standardized their implementation. According to the Pro Football Hall of Fame, "many experts concede that Shorty did much to save the game during the dark days [in the 1920s] when football was under a cloud of mounting injuries, outmoded rules, haphazard officiating and draggy contests."

== NFL technical adviser ==
George Halas persuaded the NFL to hire Ray in 1938 to rewrite its rules book and train its officials. In 1947, Ray was given a five-year contract as Technical Advisor on the Rules and Supervisor of Officials to the NFL and resigned from the Chicago public schools to devote his full efforts to his job with the NFL. He served as a technical adviser to the NFL and supervisor of officials until his retirement in 1952. Ray has been credited with making the forward pass "an effective weapon by redesigning the ball." Ray also sought to increase the speed of play. He said, "The faster you play, the more plays you create." He directed officials to be prompt in recovering the ball and getting it into play again and insisted that the 30 seconds allowed to put the ball in play be strictly enforced. With Ray's emphasis on faster play, the average number of plays per touchdown decreased from 48 in 1938 to 24 in 1945.

Ray was also responsible for numerous rules changes, including the following:

- He changed the rules so that an incomplete pass was not a loss to the passing team.
- He developed the rule that the clock stops from the moment an incomplete pass hits the ground until play resumes.

Ray's biography at the Pro Football Hall of Fame calls him pro football's "unknown hero" who "helped save an often-unexciting game from extinction." According to that biography, "Shorty insisted his officials became absolute masters of the rules book. He gave them written tests and demanded that they score better than 95 percent every time. George Halas said in 1949 that his role in hiring Ray was "my greatest contribution to the National Football League," and later said of Ray: "He was the smartest man in rules ever. He was a genius."

In his later years, however, Ray was criticized for becoming overly technical, "inundating his officials with memoranda," urging them to speed up play, call all fouls, and stop the clock. Under his guidance to speed up play, the NFL played a record 10,451 plays during the 1947 NFL season. However, penalties also increased to an average of 13 per game in 1951. Frustrated with the growing rate of penalties, a group of owners sought to have Ray fired, but loyalists including George Halas defended Ray.

Ray resigned as the NFL's technical adviser in May 1952; he said at the time that he no longer felt he could physically do the job.

== Family, later years and posthumous honors ==
Ray was married to Charlotte Johnson (sometimes known as "Lottie") in October 1908. They had four children: Charlotte (born 1912), Hugh Jr. (born 1913), Edith Virginia (born 1918), and Mary Jane (born 1921).

Ray moved to Los Angeles after retiring from his position with the NFL. He died at a sanitarium there in September 1956 after suffering a cerebral hemorrhage at age 72. He was buried in Chicago.

In March 1966, Ray was posthumously elected to the Pro Football Hall of Fame as part of its fourth class of inductees. At the induction ceremony in September 1966, Ray's son, Hugh L. Ray Jr., accepted the honor on his father's behalf. Ray and Art McNally, who served as head of officiating from 1968 to 1991, and was enshrined in 2022, are the only Hall inductees to be enshrined for work related to officiating.

In 2014, Ray's grandson, James W. Stangeland, published a biography of Ray and American football history titled, "Hugh L. Ray, The NFL's Mr. Einstein: Master Designer Of The Modern Game." Stangeland wrote the book "to set the record straight about Hugh L. Ray's true role in American football history."
