= 1912 NCAA Men's Basketball All-Americans =

- Awarded for: 1911–12 NCAA men's basketball season

The 1912 College Basketball All-American team, as chosen retroactively by the Helms Athletic Foundation. The player highlighted in gold was chosen as the Helms Foundation College Basketball Player of the Year retroactively in 1944.

Player	Team
Claus Benson	Columbia
Thomas Canfield	St. Lawrence
Lewis Castle	Syracuse
Fred Gieg	Swarthmore
Ernst Mensel	Dartmouth
Emil Schradieck	Colgate
Alphonse Schumacher	Dayton
Rufus Sisson	Dartmouth
Otto Stangel	Wisconsin
William Turner	Penn

== See also ==
- 1911–12 NCAA men's basketball season
