= 1905–06 Illinois Fighting Illini men's basketball team =

American college basketball season

1905–06 Illinois Fighting Illini men's basketball
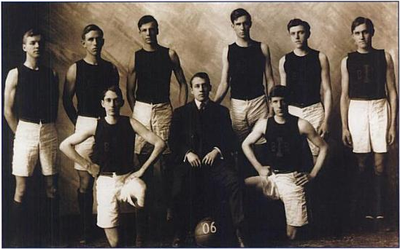
- Conference: Big Ten Conference
- Record: 6–8 (3–6 Big Ten)
- Head coach: Elwood Brown (1st season)
- Captain: Elected each game
- Home arena: Kenney Gym

1905–06 Western Conference men's basketball standings
	Conf.				Overall
Team	W		L	PCT	W		L	PCT
Minnesota	6	–	1	.857	13	–	2	.867
Wisconsin	6	–	2	.750	12	–	2	.857
Indiana	2	–	2	.500	7	–	9	.438
Chicago	3	–	5	.375	5	–	5	.500
Purdue	3	–	6	.333	4	–	7	.364
Illinois	3	–	6	.333	6	–	8	.429
Iowa	-	–	-	–	11	–	5	.688

The 1905–06 Illinois Fighting Illini men's basketball team represented the University of Illinois.

== Regular season ==
Gym manager and instructor Leo Hana, was put in charge of building the basketball program. The first University of Illinois Fighting Illini men's basketball team, led by its playing captain Roy Riley, beat Champaign High School January 6, 1906, two weeks before Hana was able to replace Riley with a "professional" coach. Elwood Brown became Illinois' first basketball coach January 20, 1906. In the first season of Illinois basketball the Illini went 6–8, 3–6 in the Big Ten.

=== Roster ===
1905–06 Illinois Fighting Illini men's basketball team
Players
Coaches

Pos.	#	Name	Height	Weight	Year	Hometown
F		Charles Stewart	—	—	So	New York, New York
G		Floyd Tallmadge	—	—	Fr	Geneva, Nebraska
C		Roy Riley	—	—	Fr	Morrison, Illinois
F		Maurice Dadant	—	—	Jr	Hamilton, Illinois
G		Herb Juul	—	—	Jr	Chicago, Illinois
G		Edward Ryan	—	—	So	Chicago, Illinois
F		Victor Cicero Kays	—	—	Sr	Magnolia, Illinois
G		Hugh L. Ray	—	—	Jr	Chicago, Illinois
F		Albert Penn	—	—	Fr	Chicago, Illinois

Head coach

- Elwood Brown (Wheaton College) (1st year)

Assistant coach(es)

Legend

- (C) Team captain
- (S) Suspended
- (I) Ineligible
- (W) Walk-on
- Injured
- Current redshirt

All-Time Illini Rosters Roster

== Schedule ==
Date time, TV	Opponent	Result	Record	Site city, state
January 6, 1906*	Champaign High School	W 71–4	1–0	Kenney Gym; Urbana, IL
January 20, 1906	Indiana; Rivalry	W 27–24	2–0 (1–0)	Kenney Gym; Urbana, IL
January 27, 1906	Purdue	W 25–19	3–0 (2–0)	Kenney Gym; Urbana, IL
February 2, 1906	at Minnesota	L 19–32	3–1 (2–1)	University of Minnesota Armory; Minneapolis, MN
February 5, 1906*	Wheaton College	W 23–21	4–1	Kenney Gym; Urbana, IL
February 8, 1906*	at Evanston YMCA	L 15–51	4–2 (2–1)	Evanston YMCA; Evanston, IL
February 9, 1906	at University of Chicago	L 14–49	4–3 (2–2)	Bartlett Gymnasium; Chicago, IL
February 10, 1906*	at Wheaton College	L 28–37	4–4	Adams Hall; Wheaton, IL
February 14, 1906*	Oberlin College	W 31–25	5–4	Kenney Gym; Urbana, IL
February 16, 1906	at Indiana; Rivalry	L 7–38	5–5 (2–3)	Assembly Hall; Bloomington, IN
February 17, 1906	at Purdue	L 22–48	5–6 (2–4)	Lafayette Colliseum; West Lafayette, IN
February 24, 1906	University of Chicago	W 24–21	6–6 (3–4)	Kenney Gym; Urbana, IL
February 28, 1906	Minnesota	L 25–27	6–7 (3–5)	Kenney Gym; Urbana, IL
March 3, 1906	Wisconsin	L 32–35	6–8 (3–6)	Kenney Gym; Urbana, IL
*Non-conference game. ^{#}Rankings from AP Poll. (#) Tournament seedings in parentheses. All times are in Central Time.
