= 1905–06 Indiana Hoosiers men's basketball team =

American college basketball season

1905–06 Indiana Hoosiers men's basketball
- Conference: Big Ten Conference
- Record: 7–9 (2–2 Western)
- Head coach: Zora Clevenger (2nd season)
- Captain: Chester Harmeson
- Home arena: Old Assembly Hall

1905–06 Western Conference men's basketball standings
	Conf.				Overall
Team	W		L	PCT	W		L	PCT
Minnesota	6	–	1	.857	13	–	2	.867
Wisconsin	6	–	2	.750	12	–	2	.857
Indiana	2	–	2	.500	7	–	9	.438
Chicago	3	–	5	.375	5	–	5	.500
Purdue	3	–	6	.333	4	–	7	.364
Illinois	3	–	6	.333	6	–	8	.429
Iowa	-	–	-	–	11	–	5	.688

The 1905–06 Indiana Hoosiers men's basketball team represented Indiana University. Their head coach was Zora Clevenger, who was in his second and final year. The team played its home games at the Old Assembly Hall in Bloomington, Indiana, and was a member of the Western Conference.

The Hoosiers finished the regular season with an overall record of 7–9 and a conference record of 2–2, finishing 3rd in the Western Conference.

== Roster ==
Name	Position	Year	Hometown
Chester Harmeson	F	Sr.	Anderson, Indiana
Cassius Hiatt	G	Sr.	Kirklin, Indiana
Edgar Kempf	F	N/A	Jasper, Indiana
Harlan McCoy	F	So.	Chrisney, Indiana
Robert Martin	C	N/A	Dana, Indiana
Leslie Maxwell	C	Sr.	Indianapolis, Indiana
Claudius Quinn	G	Jr.	Cutler, Indiana
Godfred Ritterskamp	F	Sr.	Freelandsville, Indiana
James Sanders	G	Jr.	Jasonville, Indiana
George Trimble	G	So.	Evansville, Indiana
Clifford Woody	F	Jr.	Thorntown, Indiana

== Schedule/results ==
Date time, TV	Rank^{#}	Opponent^{#}	Result	Record	Site city, state
Regular season
1/9/1906*		Butler	W 42–11	1–0	Old Assembly Hall; Bloomington, IN
1/16/1906*		Rose Poly	W 45–23	2–0	Old Assembly Hall; Bloomington, IN
1/19/1906*		at Wabash Athletic Club	W 20–13	3–0	Wabash, IN
1/20/1906		at Illinois; Rivalry	L 24–27	3–1 (0–1)	Kenney Gym; Urbana, IL
1/27/1906*		New Albany YMCA	W 46–21	4–1 (0–1)	Old Assembly Hall; Bloomingotn, IN
2/2/1906*		at Indiana State	W 27–12	5–1 (0–1)	North Hall; TerreHaute, IN
2/3/1906*		at Rose Poly	L 21–30	5–2 (0–1)	Terre Haute, IN
2/5/1906*		Wabash	L 21–29	5–3 (0–1)	Old Assembly Hall; Bloomington, IN
2/10/1906		at Purdue; Rivalry	L 25–27	5–4 (0–2)	Lafayette Coliseum; West Lafayette, IN
2/16/1906		Illinois; Rivalry	W 37–8	6–4 (1–2)	Old Assembly Hall; Bloomington, IN
2/20/1906*		at Wabash	L 9–29	6–5 (1–2)	Crawfordsville, IN
2/27/1906*		at New Albany YMCA	L 17–18	6–6 (1–2)	New Albany, IN
3/1/1906*		at Cincinnati	L 23–26	6–7 (1–2)	Schmidlapp Gymnasium; Cincinnati, OH
3/2/1906*		at Earlham	L 23–26	6–8 (1–2)	Richmond, IN
3/3/1906*		at Hartford City Athletic Club	L 13–25	6–9 (1–2)	Hartford City, IN
3/10/1906		Purdue; Rivalry	W 30–27	7–9 (2–2)	Old Assembly Hall; Bloomington, IN
*Non-conference game. ^{#}Rankings from AP Poll. (#) Tournament seedings in parentheses.
