= 1905–06 Wisconsin Badgers men's basketball team =

American college basketball season

1905–06 Wisconsin Badgers men's basketball
- Conference: Big Ten Conference
- Record: 12–2 (6–2 Western)
- Head coach: Emmett Angell
- Home arena: Red Gym

1905–06 Western Conference men's basketball standings
	Conf.				Overall
Team	W		L	PCT	W		L	PCT
Minnesota	6	–	1	.857	13	–	2	.867
Wisconsin	6	–	2	.750	12	–	2	.857
Indiana	2	–	2	.500	7	–	9	.438
Chicago	3	–	5	.375	5	–	5	.500
Purdue	3	–	6	.333	4	–	7	.364
Illinois	3	–	6	.333	6	–	8	.429
Iowa	-	–	-	–	11	–	5	.688

The 1905–06 Wisconsin Badgers men's basketball team represented University of Wisconsin–Madison. The head coach was Emmett Angell, coaching his second season with the Badgers. The team played their home games at the Red Gym in Madison, Wisconsin and was a member of the Western Conference.

== Schedule ==
Date time, TV	Rank^{#}	Opponent^{#}	Result	Record	Site city, state
Regular Season
12/14/1905*		at Manitowoc	W 35–25	1–0	Manitowoc, WI
12/15/1905*		at Menasha	W 30–22	2–0	Menasha, WI
12/27/1904*		at Oshkosh State Normal	W 30–21	3–0	Oshkosh, WI
1/13/1906*		Lawrence (WI)	W 25–20	4–0	Red Gym; Madison, WI
1/19/1906*		at Armour Institute	W 37–15	5–0	Chicago, IL
1/20/1906		at Purdue	W 34–14	6–0 (1–0)	Lafayette Colliseum; West Lafayette, IN
2/03/1906		Purdue	W 31–15	7–0 (2–0)	Red Gym; Madison, WI
2/22/1906		Minnesota	W 31–24	8–0 (3–0)	Red Gym; Madison, WI
3/02/1906		at Chicago	L 18–35	8–1 (3–1)	Bartlett Gymnasium; Chicago, IL
3/03/1906		at Illinois	W 36–32	9–1 (4–1)	Kenney Gym; Urbana, IL
3/09/1906		Chicago	W 22–19	10–1 (5–1)	Red Gym; Madison, WI
3/10/1906		Illinois	W 1–0	11–1 (6–1)	Red Gym; Madison, WI
3/16/1906*		Co. C Hudson	L 20–34	12–1	Red Gym; Madison, WI
3/17/1906		at Minnesota	L 10–16	12–2 (6–2)	Minnesota Armory; Minneapolis, MN
*Non-conference game. ^{#}Rankings from AP Poll. (#) Tournament seedings in parentheses.
