= George Grebenstein =

American basketball player and coach (1884–1980)

Biographical details
- Born: September 19, 1884; Cambridge, Massachusetts, U.S.
- Died: May 21, 1980 (aged 95); Upton, Massachusetts, U.S.

Playing career
- 1903–1907: Dartmouth
- Position: Forward

Coaching career (HC unless noted)
- 1907–1909: Harvard

Head coaching record
- Overall: 5–19

Accomplishments and honors

Championships
- As player: Helms national champion (1906)

Awards
- As player: Helms Foundation All-American (1906); All-New England Collegiate Basketball Team (1906)

George Warren Grebenstein (September 19, 1884 – May 21, 1980) was an All-American basketball player at Dartmouth College as a junior in 1905–06. A forward, he was the first Dartmouth player to be named an All-American while leading the Big Green to a 16–2 record. The Helms Athletic Foundation retroactively named Dartmouth the national champion that season since it occurred prior to the NCAA tournament. He graduated from Dartmouth in 1907. Grebenstein went on to coach the Harvard men's basketball team in 1907–08 and 1908–09. He compiled a record of 5–19.

Grebenstein was a manufacturer of automobile tools and a member of the Newton, Massachusetts board of aldermen during the 1920s and 1930s. In 1940, he moved to Upton, Massachusetts, where he was town moderator, deputy election warden, civil defense director and chairman of the local Red Cross branch. During World War II, he managed small war plants in the Boston area. He then worked for the United States Department of Commerce in Boston and later for the United States Census Bureau until his retirement in 1965. He died on May 21, 1980, at his home in Upton.

== Head coaching record ==
Record table
Season	Team	Overall	Conference	Standing	Postseason
Harvard Crimson (Eastern Intercollegiate Basketball League) (1907–1909)
1907–08	Harvard	4–12			
1908–09	Harvard	1–7			
Harvard:		5–19			
Total:		5–19			
