= 1905–06 University of Virginia men's basketball team =

American college basketball season

1905–06 University of Virginia men's basketball
- Conference: Independent
- Record: 8–2
- Head coach: Henry Lannigan (1st season)
- Home arena: Fayerweather Gymnasium

The 1905–06 University of Virginia men's basketball team represented the University of Virginia during the 1905–06 collegiate men's basketball season in the United States. The team was led by first-year head coach Henry Lannigan, and played their home games at Fayerweather Gymnasium in Charlottesville, Virginia. Now known as the Virginia Cavaliers, the team did not have an official nickname prior to 1923.

== Schedule ==
Date time, TV	Opponent	Result	Record	Site city, state
Regular season
January 18*	Charlottesville YMCA	W 30–9	1–0	Fayerweather Gymnasium; Charlottesville, VA
January 26*	Washington & Lee	W 22–6	2–0	Fayerweather Gymnasium; Charlottesville, VA
January 30*	Staunton YMCA	W 35–13	3–0	Fayerweather Gymnasium; Charlottesville, VA
January 31*	Charlottesville YMCA	W 26–12	4–0	Fayerweather Gymnasium; Charlottesville, VA
February 2*	at Baltimore YMCA	L 7–35	4–1	Baltimore, MD
February 3*	vs. Carroll Institute	L 12–62	4–2	Washington, DC
February 23*	Bridgewater	W	5–2	Fayerweather Gymnasium; Charlottesville, VA
March 6*	Charlottesville YMCA	W 20–5	6–2	Fayerweather Gymnasium; Charlottesville, VA
March 9*	at William & Mary	W 22–19	7–2	Williamsburg, VA
March 10*	at Richmond YMCA	W 18–9	8–2	Richmond, VA
*Non-conference game. (#) Tournament seedings in parentheses. All times are in Eastern Time.
