= 1905–06 Cincinnati Bearcats men's basketball team =

American college basketball season

1905–06 Cincinnati Bearcats men's basketball
- Conference: Independent
- Record: 2–1
- Head coach: Amos Foster (2nd season)
- Home arena: Schmidlapp Gymnasium

The 1905–06 Cincinnati Bearcats men's basketball team represented the University of Cincinnati during the 1905–06 collegiate men's basketball season. The head coach was Amos Foster, coaching his second season with the Bearcats.

== Schedule ==
| Date time, TV | Opponent | Result | Record | Site city, state |
|---|---|---|---|---|
| January 6 | Yale | L 0–23 | 0–1 | Schmidlapp Gymnasium; Cincinnati, OH |
| February 16 | Kentucky | W 38–09 | 1–1 | Schmidlapp Gymnasium; Cincinnati, OH |
| March 1 | Indiana | W 25–22 | 2–1 | Schmidlapp Gymnasium; Cincinnati, OH |
*Non-conference game. (#) Tournament seedings in parentheses.
