= 1905–06 Connecticut Aggies men's basketball team =

American college basketball season

1905–06 Connecticut Aggies men's basketball
- Conference: Athletic League of New England State Colleges
- Record: 6–3 (0–0 ALNESC)

The 1905–06 Connecticut Aggies men's basketball team represented Connecticut Agricultural College, now the University of Connecticut, in the 1905–06 collegiate men's basketball season. The Aggies completed the season with a 6–3 overall record. The Aggies were members of the Athletic League of New England State Colleges.

== Schedule ==
Date time, TV	Rank^{#}	Opponent^{#}	Result	Record	Site (attendance) city, state
Regular Season
*		Manchester High School	W 70–28	1–0	
*		Wesleyan	L 12–86	1–1	
*		Bulkeley School	W 74–34	2–1	
*		Windham High School	L 9–15	2–2	
*		Willimantic YMCA	L 26–31	2–3	
*		New Britain	W 65–9	3–3	
*		Alumni	W 50–27	4–3	
*		Hartford Public High School	W 119–27	5–3	
*		Meriden High School	W 124–11	6–3	
*Non-conference game. ^{#}Rankings from AP Poll. (#) Tournament seedings in parentheses. All times are in Eastern Time.

Schedule Source:
