= 1905–06 Niagara Purple Eagles men's basketball team =

American college basketball season

1905–06 Niagara Purple Eagles men's basketball
- Conference: Independent
- Record: 4–2
- Head coach: Charles McGrath (1st season)

The 1905–06 Niagara Purple Eagles men's basketball team represented Niagara University during the 1905–06 college men's basketball season. The head coach was Charles McGrath, coaching his first season with the Purple Eagles.

== Schedule ==
Date time, TV	Opponent	Result	Record	Site city, state
	Niagara Falls	W 20–6	1–0	Lewiston, NY
	Niagara Falls	W 31–17	2–0	Lewiston, NY
	Niagara Falls	L 11–15	2–1	Lewiston, NY
	Niagara Falls	W 22–14	3–1	Lewiston, NY
	at Lockport	L 25–26	3–2	
	Buffalo Club	W 20–12	4–2	Lewiston, NY
*Non-conference game. (#) Tournament seedings in parentheses.
