= UMass Lowell River Hawks men's basketball =

Basketball team at the University of Massachusetts Lowell

UMass Lowell River Hawks
2026–27 UMass Lowell River Hawks men's basketball team
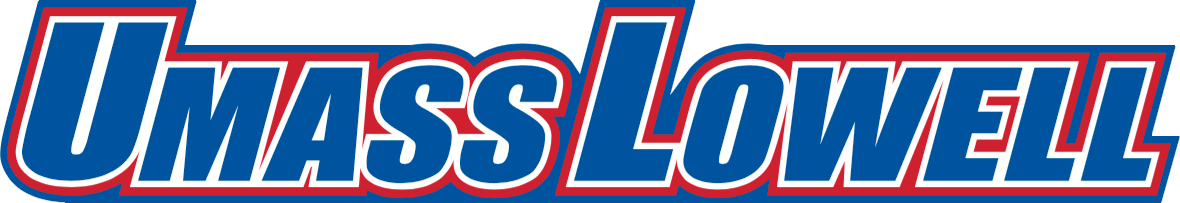
- University: University of Massachusetts Lowell
- Head coach: Pat Duquette (14th season)
- Location: Lowell, Massachusetts
- Arena: Tsongas Center; Kennedy Family Athletic Complex (capacity: Tsongas Center 7,649; Kennedy Family Athletic Complex 2,100)
- Conference: America East; NCAA Division I Division
- Nickname: River Hawks
- Colors: Blue, white, and red

NCAA Division II tournament champions
- 1988
Other NCAA Division II tournament results
Final Four	1988
Elite Eight	1988, 2003, 2004
Sweet Sixteen	1988, 2003, 2004, 2006
Appearances	1988, 2001, 2002, 2003, 2004, 2006, 2009, 2010, 2011, 2012

Conference tournament champions
- Northeast 10: 2003, 2004, 2010

Conference regular-season champions
- NECC; 1988 Northeast-10; 2003, 2004

The UMass Lowell River Hawks men's basketball team represents the University of Massachusetts Lowell in Lowell, Massachusetts, United States. Beginning in the 2013–14 season, the River Hawks made the jump to NCAA Division I and joined the America East Conference. As part of their transition from Division II to Division I, they were not eligible for postseason play until the 2017–2018 season. The team is coached by Pat Duquette, who is in his tenth season. The River Hawks currently play most of their home games at the Kennedy Family Athletic Complex but some games will be played at Tsongas Center. In 1988, UMass Lowell (then known as the University of Lowell) was the NCAA Division II national champions.

== Postseason ==
=== NCAA Division II Tournament results ===
The River Hawks have appeared in the NCAA Division II Tournament ten times, making that tournament's Elite Eight three times. Their combined record is 15–9. They were Division II national champions in 1988.

Year	Round	Opponent	Result
1988	Regional semifinals Regional Finals; Elite Eight; Final Four; National Championship Game	Assumption; New Haven; Alabama A&M; Florida Southern; Alaska Anchorage	W 90–65; W 84–72; W 76–68; W 88–81; W 75–72
2001	Regional Quarterfinals; Regional semifinals	Queens; St. Michael's	W 85–67; L 69–80
2002	Regional Quarterfinals; Regional semifinals	Bentley; Adelphi	W 72–70; L 57–72
2003	Regional Quarterfinals; Regional semifinals Regional Finals; Elite Eight	Saint Rose; Bridgeport; C.W. Post; Bowie State	W 91–67; W 86–73; W 65–59; L 62–72
2004	Regional Quarterfinals; Regional semifinals Regional Finals; Elite Eight	Bridgeport; Southern New Hampshire; Bryant; Humboldt State	W 84–64; W 67–61 ^{OT} W 63–62; L 82–89
2006	Regional Quarterfinals; Regional semifinals Regional Finals	Bryant; Saint Anselm; Stonehill	W 77–67; W 74–70; L 80–89
2009	Regional Quarterfinals	Merrimack	L 84–86 ^{OT}
2010	Regional Quarterfinals	Merrimack	L 62–81
2011	Regional Quarterfinals	Saint Rose	L 68–81
2012	Regional Quarterfinals	Bloomfield	L 83–91

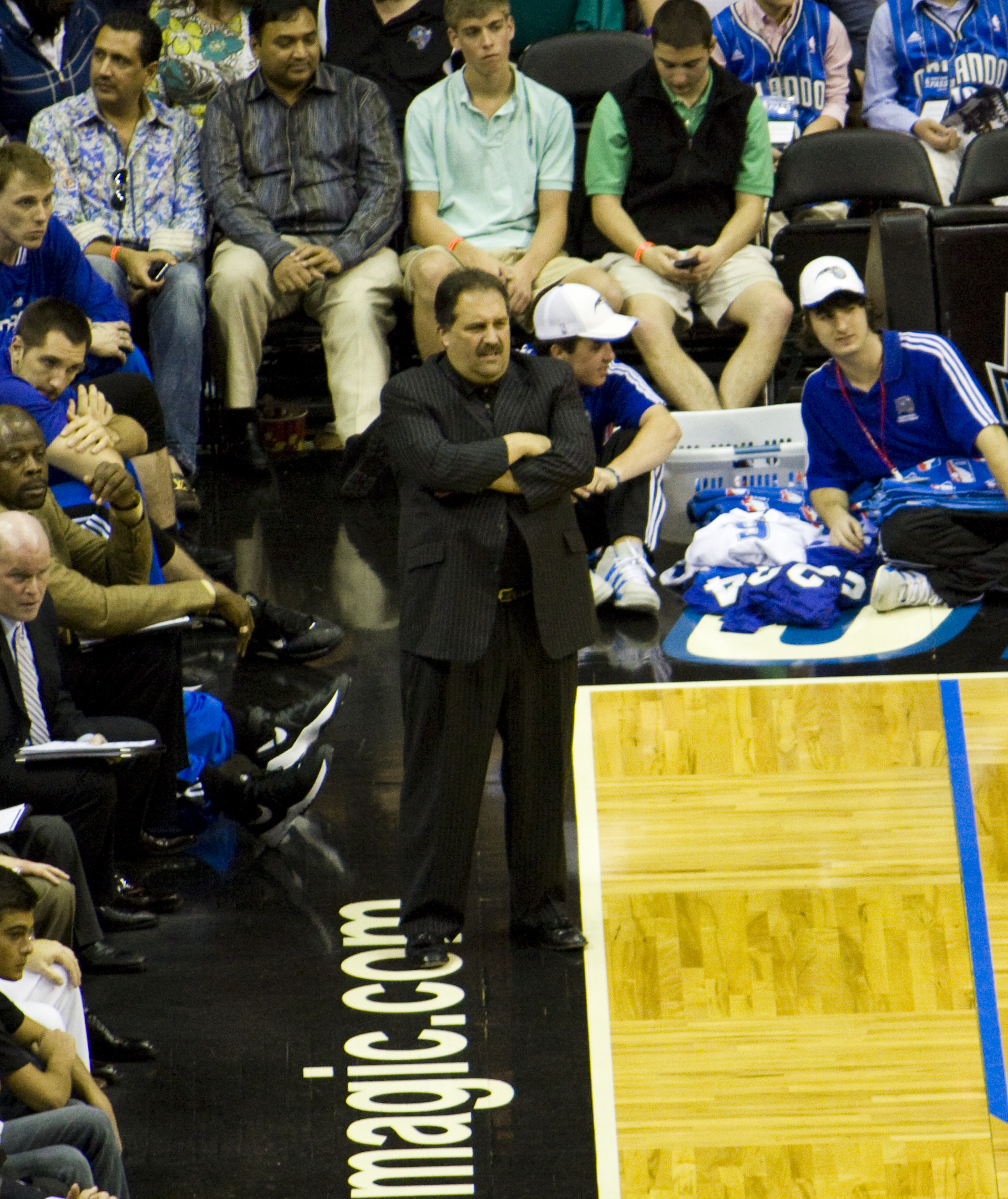
Former Men's Basketball Coach Stan Van Gundy

== Notable athletes and coaches ==
- Leo Parent, two-time All-American
- Elad Inbar, 2004 Division II Player of the Year

== Season-by-season record ==
Season	Coach	Overall	Conference	Standing	Postseason
Don Doucette (New England Collegiate Conference) (1983–1988)
1983–84	Don Doucette	15–12	7–7		
1984–85	Don Doucette	9–19	2–12		
1985–86	Don Doucette	12–17	3–9		
1986–87	Don Doucette	21–8	11–3		
1987–88	Don Doucette	27–7	8–4		NCAA Division II Champions
Don Doucette:		84-63	31-35		
Stan Van Gundy (New England Collegiate Conference) (1988–1992)
1988–89	Stan Van Gundy	16–13	9–5		
1989–90	Stan Van Gundy	13–15	7–7		
1990–91	Stan Van Gundy	11–17	5–9		
1991–92	Stan Van Gundy	14–15	7–7		
Stan Van Gundy:		54-60	28-28		
Greg Herenda (Northeast-10 Conference) (2008–2013)
2008–09	Greg Herenda	21–8	16–6	2nd	NCAA Division II East Regional first round
2009–10	Greg Herenda	20–12	13–9	7th	NCAA Division II East Regional first round
2010–11	Greg Herenda	20–10	14–8	6th	NCAA Division II East Regional first round
2011–12	Greg Herenda	19–11	13–9	4th	NCAA Division II East Regional first round
2012–13	Greg Herenda	15–13	10–12	8th	
Greg Herenda:		95-54	66-44		
Pat Duquette (America East Conference) (2013–present)
2013-14	Pat Duquette	10-18	8-8	5th	
2014-15	Pat Duquette	12–17	6–10	6th	
2015-16	Pat Duquette	11–18	7–9	5th	
2016-17	Pat Duquette	11–20	5–11	6th	
2017-18	Pat Duquette	12–18	6–10	T–6th	
2018-19	Pat Duquette	15–17	7–9	5th	
2019-20	Pat Duquette	13–19	7-9	6th	
2020-21	Pat Duquette	11-12	7-8	6th	
2021-22	Pat Duquette	15-16	7-11	8th	
2022-23	Pat Duquette	26-8	11-5	2nd	
2023-24	Pat Duquette	22-10	11-5	2nd	
Pat Duquette:		158-173	82-95		
Total:					
National champion Postseason invitational champion Conference regular season champion Conference regular season and conference tournament champion Division regular season champion Division regular season and conference tournament champion Conference tournament champion
