= Washington Bears =

The Washington Bears were an independently run all-black professional basketball team that existed throughout most of the 1940s. With regard to official known records for those that played with the Bears, the first official season of play for them is believed to be the 1940-41 season (meaning they were first created either in 1940 or 1941), while their final season of play was the 1946-47 season (folding sometime either in 1946 or 1947) after World War II concluded.

Sponsored by movie theater owner Abe Lichtman, the Bears played their home games at Turner's Arena in Washington, DC. Most of the team was composed of former New York Renaissance players, such as Pop Gates, Tarzan Cooper, Jackie Bethards, and John Isaacs. In 1943, the Bears achieved a 41-0 record and won the World Professional Basketball Tournament, defeating the Oshkosh All-Stars in the championship game.
