= List of Syracuse Orange men's basketball seasons =

The following is a complete list of Syracuse Orange men's basketball seasons for Syracuse University.

== Year-by-year results ==
Since playing its first official season in 1898–99, Syracuse ranks sixth in total victories among all NCAA Division I programs and seventh in all-time win percentage among programs with at least 50 years in Division I, with an all-time win–loss record of 2042–931 (.687) as of March 30, 2021 (vacated wins included).

Statistics overview
Season	Coach	Overall	Conference	Standing	Postseason
No coach (1898–1903)
1900–01	No coach	2–2			
1901–02	No coach	3–3			
1902–03	No coach	1–8			
No coach:		6–13			
John A.R. Scott (Independent) (1903–1911)
1903–04	John A.R. Scott	11–8			
1904–05	John A.R. Scott	14–7			
1905–06	John A.R. Scott	9–3			
1906–07	John A.R. Scott	4–3			
1907–08	John A.R. Scott	10–3			
1908–09	John A.R. Scott	7–8			
1909–10	John A.R. Scott	3–11			
1910–11	John A.R. Scott	6–11			
John Scott:		64–54			
Edmund Dollard (Independent) (1911–1924)
1911–12	Edmund Dollard	11–3			
1912–13	Edmund Dollard	8–3			
1913–14	Edmund Dollard	12–0			
1914–15	Edmund Dollard	10–1			
1915–16	Edmund Dollard	9–3			
1916–17	Edmund Dollard	13–3			
1917–18	Edmund Dollard	16–1			Helms National Champion
1918–19	Edmund Dollard	13–3			
1919–20	Edmund Dollard	15–3			
1920–21	Edmund Dollard	12–9			
1921–22	Edmund Dollard	16–8			
1922–23	Edmund Dollard	8–12			
1923–24	Edmund Dollard	8–10			
Ed Dollard:		151–59			
Lew Andreas (Independent) (1924–1950)
1924–25	Lew Andreas	15–2			
1925–26	Lew Andreas	19–1			Helms National Champion
1926–27	Lew Andreas	15–4			
1927–28	Lew Andreas	10–6			
1928–29	Lew Andreas	11–4			
1929–30	Lew Andreas	18–2			
1930–31	Lew Andreas	16–4			
1931–32	Lew Andreas	13–8			
1932–33	Lew Andreas	14–2			
1933–34	Lew Andreas	15–2			
1934–35	Lew Andreas	15–2			
1935–36	Lew Andreas	12–5			
1936–37	Lew Andreas	13–4			
1937–38	Lew Andreas	14–5			
1938–39	Lew Andreas	15–4			
1939–40	Lew Andreas	10–8			
1940–41	Lew Andreas	14–5			
1941–42	Lew Andreas	15–6			
1942–43	Lew Andreas	8–10			
1944–45	Lew Andreas	7–12			
1945–46	Lew Andreas	23–4			NIT Quarterfinal
1946–47	Lew Andreas	19–6			NCAA District Qualification Game
1947–48	Lew Andreas	11–13			
1948–49	Lew Andreas	18–7			
1949–50	Lew Andreas	18–9			NIT Quarterfinal
Lew Andreas:		358–135			
Marc Guley (Independent) (1950–1962)
1950–51	Marc Guley	19–9			
1951–52	Marc Guley	14–6			
1952–53	Marcel Guley	7–11			
1953–54	Marc Guley	10–9			
1954–55	Marc Guley	10–11			
1955–56	Marc Guley	14–8			
1956–57	Marc Guley	18–7			NCAA University Division Elite Eight
1957–58	Marc Guley	11–10			
1958–59	Marc Guley	14–9			
1959–60	Marc Guley	13–8			
1960–61	Marc Guley	4–19			
1961–62	Marc Guley	2–22			
Marc Guley:		136–129			
Fred Lewis (Independent) (1962–1968)
1962–63	Fred Lewis	8–13			
1963–64	Fred Lewis	17–8			NIT First Round
1964–65	Fred Lewis	13–10			
1965–66	Fred Lewis	22–6			NCAA University Division Elite Eight
1966–67	Fred Lewis	20–6			NIT First Round
1967–68	Fred Lewis	11–14			
Fred Lewis:		91–57			
Roy Danforth (Independent) (1968–1976)
1968–69	Roy Danforth	9–16			
1969–70	Roy Danforth	12–12			
1970–71	Roy Danforth	19–7			NIT First Round
1971–72	Roy Danforth	22–6			NIT Quarterfinal
1972–73	Roy Danforth	24–5			NCAA University Division Sweet Sixteen
1973–74	Roy Danforth	19–7			NCAA Division I First Round
1974–75	Roy Danforth	23–9		^{[Note A]}	NCAA Division I Final Four
1975–76	Roy Danforth	20–9		^{[Note A]}	NCAA Division I First Round
Roy Danforth:		148–71			
Jim Boeheim (Independent) (1976–1979)
1976–77	Jim Boeheim	26–4		^{[Note A]}	NCAA Division I Sweet Sixteen
1977–78	Jim Boeheim	22–6		^{[Note A]}	NCAA Division I First Round
1978–79	Jim Boeheim	26–4		^{[Note A]}	NCAA Division I Sweet Sixteen
Jim Boeheim (Big East Conference) (1979–2013)
1979–80	Jim Boeheim	26–4	5–1	T–1st	NCAA Division I Sweet Sixteen
1980–81	Jim Boeheim	22–12	6–8	6th	NIT Runner-up
1981–82	Jim Boeheim	16–13	7–7	T–5th	NIT Second Round
1982–83	Jim Boeheim	21–10	9–7	5th	NCAA Division I Second Round
1983–84	Jim Boeheim	23–9	12–4	T–2nd	NCAA Division I Sweet Sixteen
1984–85	Jim Boeheim	22–9	9–7	T–3rd	NCAA Division I Second Round
1985–86	Jim Boeheim	26–6	14–2	T–1st	NCAA Division I Second Round
1986–87	Jim Boeheim	31–7	12–4	T–1st	NCAA Division I Runner–Up
1987–88	Jim Boeheim	26–9	11–5	2nd	NCAA Division I Second Round
1988–89	Jim Boeheim	30–8	10–6	3rd	NCAA Division I Elite Eight
1989–90	Jim Boeheim	26–7	12–4	T–1st	NCAA Division I Sweet Sixteen
1990–91	Jim Boeheim	26–6	12–4	1st	NCAA Division I First Round
1991–92	Jim Boeheim	22–10	10–8	T–5th	NCAA Division I Second Round
1992–93	Jim Boeheim	20–9	10–8	3rd	
1993–94	Jim Boeheim	23–7	13–5	2nd	NCAA Division I Sweet Sixteen
1994–95	Jim Boeheim	20–10	12–6	3rd	NCAA Division I Second Round
1995–96	Jim Boeheim	29–9	12–6	2nd (BE7)	NCAA Division I Runner–Up
1996–97	Jim Boeheim	19–13	9–9	4th (BE7)	NIT First Round
1997–98	Jim Boeheim	26–9	12–6	1st (BE7)	NCAA Division I Sweet Sixteen
1998–99	Jim Boeheim	21–12	10–8	4th	NCAA Division I First Round
1999–00	Jim Boeheim	26–6	13–3	T–1st (West)	NCAA Division I Sweet Sixteen
2000–01	Jim Boeheim	25–9	10–6	T–2nd (West)	NCAA Division I Second Round
2001–02	Jim Boeheim	23–13	9–7	T–3rd (West)	NIT Fourth Place
2002–03	Jim Boeheim	30–5	13–3	T–1st (West)	NCAA Division I Champion
2003–04	Jim Boeheim	23–8	11–5	T–3rd	NCAA Division I Sweet Sixteen
2004–05	Jim Boeheim	27–7^{[Note B]}	11–5^{[Note B]}	T–3rd^{[Note B]}	NCAA Division I First Round
2005–06	Jim Boeheim	23–12^{[Note C]}	7–9^{[Note C]}	T–9th^{[Note C]}	NCAA Division I First Round
2006–07	Jim Boeheim	24–11^{[Note D]}	10–6^{[Note D]}	T–5th^{[Note D]}	NIT Quarterfinal
2007–08	Jim Boeheim	21–14	9–9	T–8th	NIT Quarterfinal
2008–09	Jim Boeheim	28–10	11–7	6th	NCAA Division I Sweet Sixteen
2009–10	Jim Boeheim	30–5	15–3	T–1st	NCAA Division I Sweet Sixteen
2010–11	Jim Boeheim	27–8^{[Note E]}	12–6^{[Note E]}	4th^{[Note E]}	NCAA Division I Second Round
2011–12	Jim Boeheim	34–3^{[Note F]}	17–1^{[Note F]}	1st^{[Note F]}	NCAA Division I Elite Eight
2012–13	Jim Boeheim	30–10	11–7	5th	NCAA Division I Final Four
Jim Boeheim (Atlantic Coast Conference) (2013–2023)
2013–14	Jim Boeheim	28–6	14–4	2nd	NCAA Division I Second Round
2014–15	Jim Boeheim	18–13	9–9	8th	Ineligible
2015–16	Jim Boeheim; Mike Hopkins	19–9^{[Note G]} 4–5	9–6^{[Note G]} 0–3	9th	NCAA Division I Final Four
2016–17	Jim Boeheim	19–15	10–8	T–7th	NIT Second Round
2017–18	Jim Boeheim	23–14	8–10	T–10th	NCAA Division I Sweet Sixteen
2018–19	Jim Boeheim	20–14	10–8	6th	NCAA Division I First Round
2019–20	Jim Boeheim	18–14	10–10	T–6th	No postseason held (COVID)
2020–21	Jim Boeheim	18–10	9–7	8th	NCAA Division I Sweet Sixteen
2021–22	Jim Boeheim	16–17	9–11	9th	
2022–23	Jim Boeheim	17–15	10–10	T–8th	
Jim Boeheim:		1,015–442	464–275		
Adrian Autry (Atlantic Coast Conference) (2023–2026)
2023–24	Adrian Autry	20–12	11–9	T–5th	
2024–25	Adrian Autry	14–19	7–13	14th	
2025–26	Adrian Autry	15–17	6–12	14th	
Adrian Autry:		49–48	31–33		
Gerry McNamara (Atlantic Coast Conference) (2026–present)
2026–27	Gerry McNamara				
Gerry McNamara:		0–0	0–0		
Total:		2,022–1,013^{[Note H]}			
National champion Postseason invitational champion Conference regular season champion Conference regular season and conference tournament champion Division regular season champion Division regular season and conference tournament champion Conference tournament champion

^A. From 1975 to 1982, the Eastern College Athletic Conference (ECAC) organized annual regional end-of-season men's basketball tournaments for independent Division I ECAC member colleges and universities in the Northeastern United States. The winner of each regional tournament was declared the ECAC regional champion for the season and received an automatic bid in the NCAA Division I men's basketball tournament.
^B. The NCAA vacated 15 wins from the 2004–05 season as a result of the Syracuse athletics scandal.
^C. The NCAA vacated 23 wins from the 2005–06 season as a result of the Syracuse athletics scandal.
^D. The NCAA vacated 22 wins from the 2006–07 season as a result of the Syracuse athletics scandal.
^E. The NCAA vacated 7 wins from the 2010–11 season as a result of the Syracuse athletics scandal.
^F. The NCAA vacated 34 wins from the 2011–12 season as a result of the Syracuse athletics scandal.
^G. Boeheim was suspended for nine games during the 2015–16 season, during which Syracuse went 4–5 overall, and 0–3 in conference. So while the team's record was 23–14 overall, 9–9 in conference, Boeheim is credited with 19–9 overall, 9–6 in conference.
^H. Syracuse's official NCAA record excludes the aforementioned 101 vacated wins, however Syracuse claims all of its NCAA appearances and conference titles from those years.
