= Syracuse Orange men's basketball =

Men's basketball team of Syracuse University, New York

2026–27 Syracuse Orange men's basketball team
- University: Syracuse University
- First season: 1898–99; 128 years ago
- Athletic director: John Wildhack
- Head coach: Gerry McNamara; 1st season, 0–0 (–)
- Location: Syracuse, New York
- Arena: JMA Wireless Dome (capacity: 35,642)
- NCAA division: Division I
- Conference: ACC
- Nickname: Orange
- Colors: Orange
- Student section: Otto's Army
- All-time record: 2,022–1,012–1 (.666)
- NCAA tournament record: 70–41 (.631)

NCAA Division I tournament champions
- 2003
Other NCAA Division I tournament results
Runner-up	1987, 1996
Final Four	1975, 1987, 1996, 2003, 2013, 2016
Elite Eight	1957, 1966, 1975, 1987, 1989, 1996, 2003, 2012, 2013, 2016
Sweet Sixteen	1957, 1966, 1973, 1975, 1977, 1979, 1980, 1984, 1987, 1989, 1990, 1994, 1996, 1998, 2000, 2003, 2004, 2009, 2010, 2012, 2013, 2016, 2018, 2021
Appearances	1957, 1966, 1973, 1974, 1975, 1976, 1977, 1978, 1979, 1980, 1983, 1984, 1985, 1986, 1987, 1988, 1989, 1990, 1991, 1992, 1994, 1995, 1996, 1998, 1999, 2000, 2001, 2003, 2004, 2005, 2006, 2009, 2010, 2011, 2012, 2013, 2014, 2016, 2018, 2019, 2021

Pre-tournament Helms national champions
- 1917–18, 1925–26

Conference tournament champions
- ECAC: 1975, 1976, 1977 Big East: 1981, 1988, 1992, 2005, 2006

Conference regular-season champions
- Big East: 1980, 1986, 1987, 1990, 1991, 2000, 2003, 2010, 2012

Conference division champions
- Big East 7: 1998 Big East West: 2000, 2003

Uniforms
Home	Away

The Syracuse Orange men's basketball program is an intercollegiate men's basketball team representing Syracuse University in Syracuse, New York. The program is classified in the NCAA Division I of the National Collegiate Athletic Association (NCAA), and the team competes in the Atlantic Coast Conference (ACC).

Syracuse is considered one of the most prestigious college basketball programs in the country with 3 overall claimed National Championships and 1 NCAA Tournament championship, as well being a National Runner-up twice. Syracuse is ranked sixth in total victories among all NCAA Division I programs and seventh in all-time win percentage among programs with at least 50 years in Division I, with an all-time win–loss record of 2042–931^{†} (.687) as of March 29, 2021. The Orange are also sixth in NCAA Tournament appearances (41), seventh in NCAA Tournament victories (70^{†}), and eleventh in Final Four appearances (6).

The Orange play their home games at the JMA Wireless Dome, often referred to as the JMA Dome and known as the Carrier Dome from 1980 to 2022. The JMA Wireless Dome is the largest arena in NCAA DI basketball with a maximum capacity of 35,642. Syracuse's home court total attendance has led the nation 25 times, and its per-game season average attendance has been ranked first 14 times since the opening of the Carrier Dome in 1980. The most recent record-breaking game was against Duke in 2019 with the crowd of 35,642 people. The JMA Dome is often considered one of the best home court advantages in college basketball.

Under former head coach Jim Boeheim, 10 Big East regular season championships, five Big East tournament championships, 35 NCAA tournament appearances (and 41 all-time), and three appearances in the national title game.

In 2015, after a lengthy investigation, the NCAA's Committee on Infractions ordered Syracuse to vacate 101 wins from five different seasons; however, the NCAA confirmed that sanctions did not include the removal of any trophies or banners, and Syracuse claims all of its NCAA Tournaments appearances and conference titles from those years. The investigation required Syracuse to vacate 79 wins from the 2006, 2007, and 2012 seasons. (Note: As of 2017, the NCAA recognizes Kansas as the record holder for current consecutive winning seasons, listing Syracuse as the "unofficial" record.)

== History ==
=== Early history ===
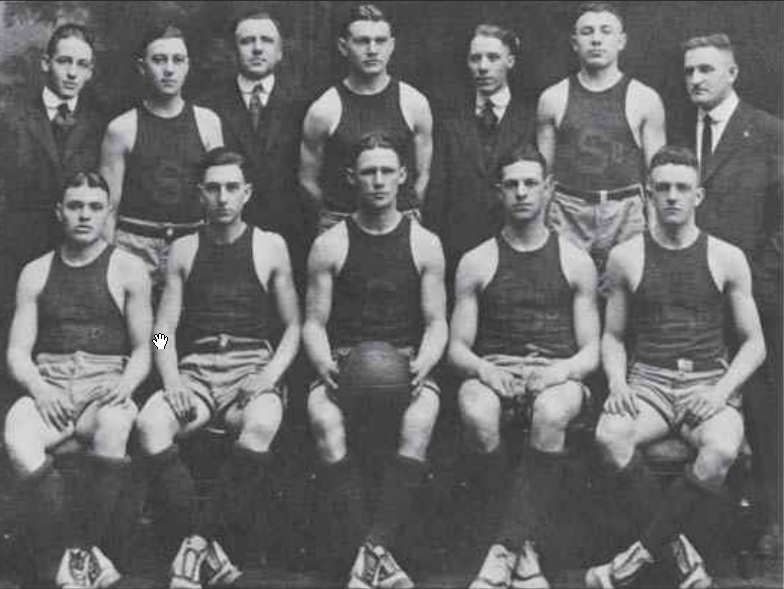
The 1917–18 Syracuse Orangemen basketball team, retroactively designated a national champion by Helms

Basketball started at Syracuse in February 1898 and Athletic Director John A. R. Scott served as the first coach. Syracuse fielded its first varsity basketball team in 1916–17. The program rose to national prominence early in its history, retroactively being recognized by the Helms Athletic Foundation as a national champion for 1918 (under Coach Edmund Dollard) and 1926. While the NCAA lists the historical Helms selections for reference, neither the Helms nor the Premo-Porretta Power Poll titles are officially recognized as NCAA national championships. The program made National Invitation Tournament appearances in 1946 and 1950, won the 1951 National Campus Tournament, and made its first NCAA men's basketball tournament appearance in 1957. Notable early era players included Hall of Famer Vic Hanson and racial pioneer Wilmeth Sidat-Singh.

=== National emergence ===
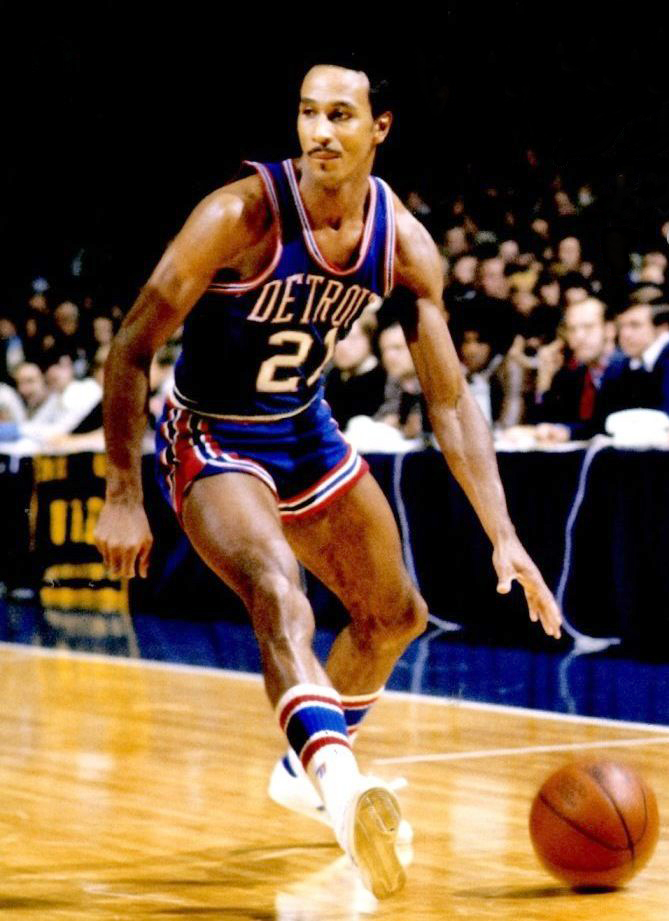
Hall of Famer guard Dave Bing

The modern era of Syracuse basketball began with the arrival of future Hall of Famer Dave Bing. As a sophomore in 1964, Bing led the team to an NIT appearance and as a senior in 1966, he led the team to its second NCAA tournament appearance, where it reached the regional final. Bing's backcourt partner on these teams was future Syracuse coach Jim Boeheim.

Syracuse remained competitive after Bing's departure, with NIT appearances in 1967, 1971, and 1972. Under coach Roy Danforth, in 1973, the team began a string of consecutive NCAA appearances highlighted by a Final Four appearance in 1975. The 1975 squad featured guard Jim Lee and forward Rudy Hackett and was affectionately known as "Roy's Runts."

=== Big East era (1979–2013) ===
==== Jim Boeheim takeover ====
Following the 1976 season, Danforth was hired away by Tulane University and the university turned to young assistant Jim Boeheim (a native of Lyons, New York) to assume the helm. Boeheim extended the string of NCAA appearances to nine, with bids in each of his first four seasons, a period in which his teams won 100 games. These teams featured star forward Louis Orr and center Roosevelt Bouie, and were sometimes referred to as the "Louie and Bouie Show."

==== A new conference ====
Syracuse was a founding member of the Big East Conference in 1979, along with UConn, Georgetown University, St. John's University and Providence College. Syracuse and Georgetown were each ranked in the top ten in 1980, and a new and major rivalry blossomed when Georgetown snapped Syracuse's 57-game home winning streak in the final men's basketball game played at Manley Field House. Over the next ten seasons, these two schools met eight times in the Big East tournament, four times in the finals, and met numerous times on national television during the regular season.

Syracuse won the Big East tournament in 1981, but was passed over by the NCAA Tournament. The team, featuring Danny Schayes and Leo Rautins, finished runner-up in the NIT. The team returned to the NIT in 1982, before beginning another extended streak of NCAA appearances in 1983.

==== The Pearl ====

In 1983, heralded high school phenomenon Dwayne "Pearl" Washington joined the team, and led the school to NCAA appearances in 1984, 1985, and 1986, before leaving school early for the NBA draft.

Washington grew up in the Brownsville section of Brooklyn, New York, where he acquired his nickname as an eight-year-old in a taunting comparison to Earl "the Pearl" Monroe. He was a playground phenomenon from Boys and Girls High School in Brooklyn, and was rated as the number one overall high school player in the United States 1983. He brought his flashy play to Syracuse University and the Carrier Dome. "The Pearl" was the master of the "shake and bake" and the "cross-over" moves.

It is believed that Pearl Washington brought Syracuse basketball to national prominence and helped usher the Big East into the national spotlight in the mid-1980s. In the Carrier Dome's first three years, Syracuse's highest attendance mark was a mere 20,401 in the 1982–83. In 1983, Pearl's freshman year, Syracuse's attendance increased to 22,380 per game. As a sophomore, Syracuse led the nation in attendance for the first time in school history. Syracuse would be the NCAA's attendance leader for the next ten years. By the time Washington was a junior, Syracuse's average attendance had jumped to 26,225. Syracuse Coach Jim Boeheim, who has long said that there would be no Syracuse basketball program as we know it without Pearl, once said:

He's the only guy who could just overnight fill the place like that. He had an unbelievable effect on our program. Everybody says that Patrick Ewing and Chris Mullin made the Big East, but I think Pearl made the league. They were the best players, but Pearl was the player that people turned out to see and turned on their TVs to watch. We had the highest-rated games every year that Pearl was here. He was a guy who everybody wanted to see play. He not only helped make our program, he helped make the Big East and he helped college basketball.

In 2016, at the December 17 Georgetown game, joined alongside Washington's family, friends and former teammates, SU Director of Athletics John Wildhack helped unveil the No. 31 logo at center court to honor Washington. Washington died from brain cancer earlier that year eight months after being diagnosed. Washington has a street named after him in the Brownsville section of his native Brooklyn, New York.

==== Falling just short ====
Despite the early loss of Washington, Syracuse returned to the NCAAs in 1987, with a team featuring Rony Seikaly, Sherman Douglas and freshman Derrick Coleman, reaching the National Championship game before losing, 74–73, in the final to Indiana on a last-second jump shot by Keith Smart. Led by Coleman, Douglas, Seikaly, Stephen Thompson and Billy Owens, the school extended its string of NCAA appearances to 10 seasons before that string was broken in 1993, due to NCAA sanctions resulting from an incident involving a booster.

Led by guard Lawrence Moten and forward John Wallace, the school returned to the NCAAs in 1994 and 1995. In 1996, Wallace led the team to its third Final Four appearance and second National Championship game, where it played impressively before losing, 76–67, to a heavily favored Kentucky team that included nine future NBA players (Kentucky head coach Rick Pitino had been an assistant coach to Boeheim in 1976, 1977).

==== A new millennium dawns ====
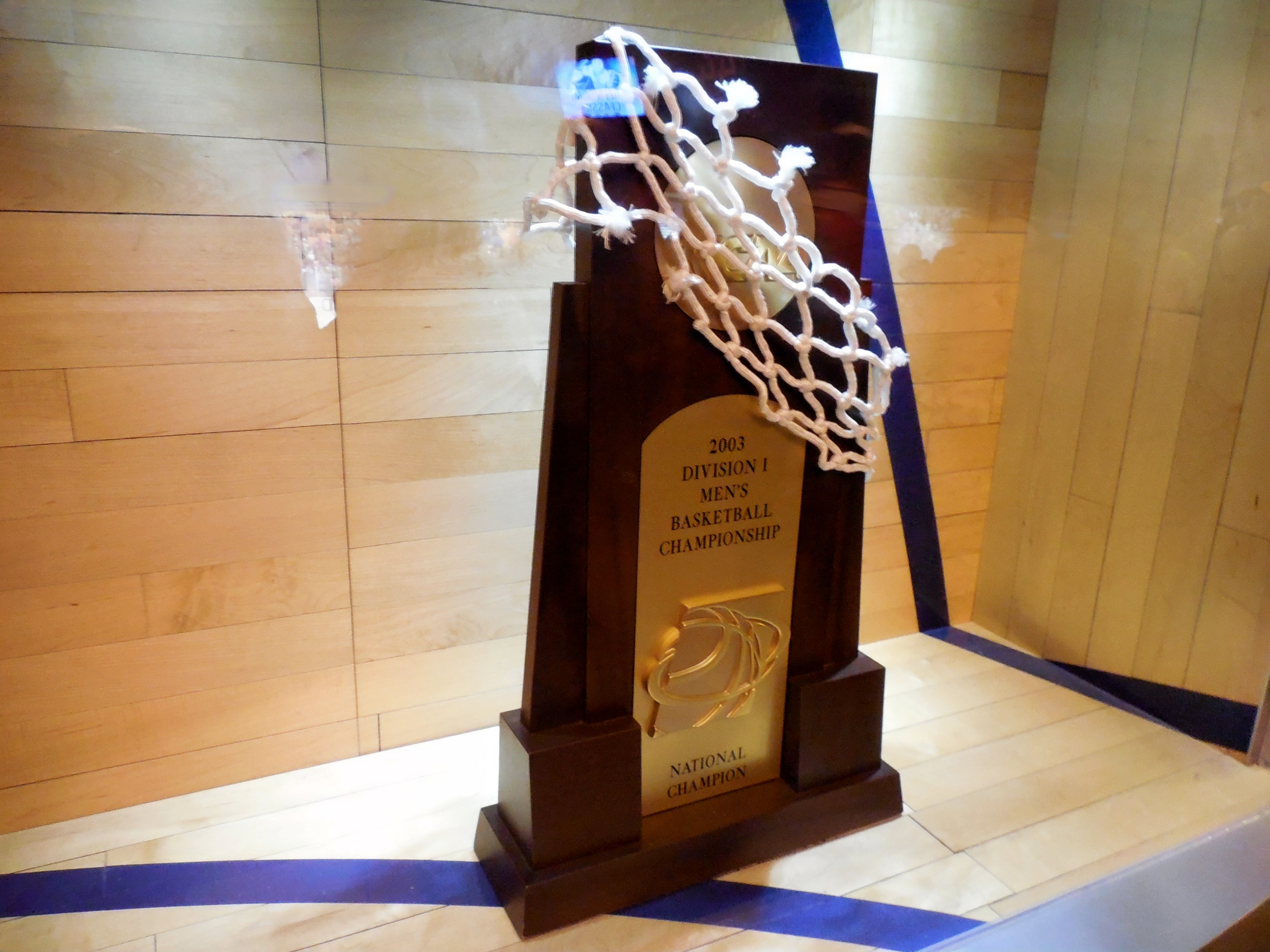
2003 NCAA Men's Basketball National Championship Trophy

The 1997 squad won 19 games but was bypassed by the NCAA tournament and appeared in the NIT. The 1998, 1999, and 2000 squads featuring guard Jason Hart and center Etan Thomas all earned NCAA bids. In 2000, the university also named its All-Century Team, recognizing its greatest players of the 20th century and the school's first 100 years of basketball. The team made a fourth consecutive NCAA appearance in 2001, but returned to the NIT in 2002, despite having a 20-win season. This marked the first time a school with 20 wins from the Big East Conference was denied a bid to the NCAA Tournament.

==== Champions at last ====
Although unranked in the preseason polls for the 2002–03 season, led by freshmen Carmelo Anthony, Gerry McNamara and sophomore Hakim Warrick, the Orangemen won their first NCAA tournament championship with an 81–78 defeat of the University of Kansas in the final. Anthony was named NCAA basketball tournament Most Outstanding Player.

==== After the crown ====
Anthony left for the NBA draft after the school year, but McNamara and Warrick stayed on, leading the team to NCAA bids in 2004 and 2005. The latter season saw Syracuse introduce a new nickname, dropping "Orangemen" and "Orangewomen" in favor of "Orange".

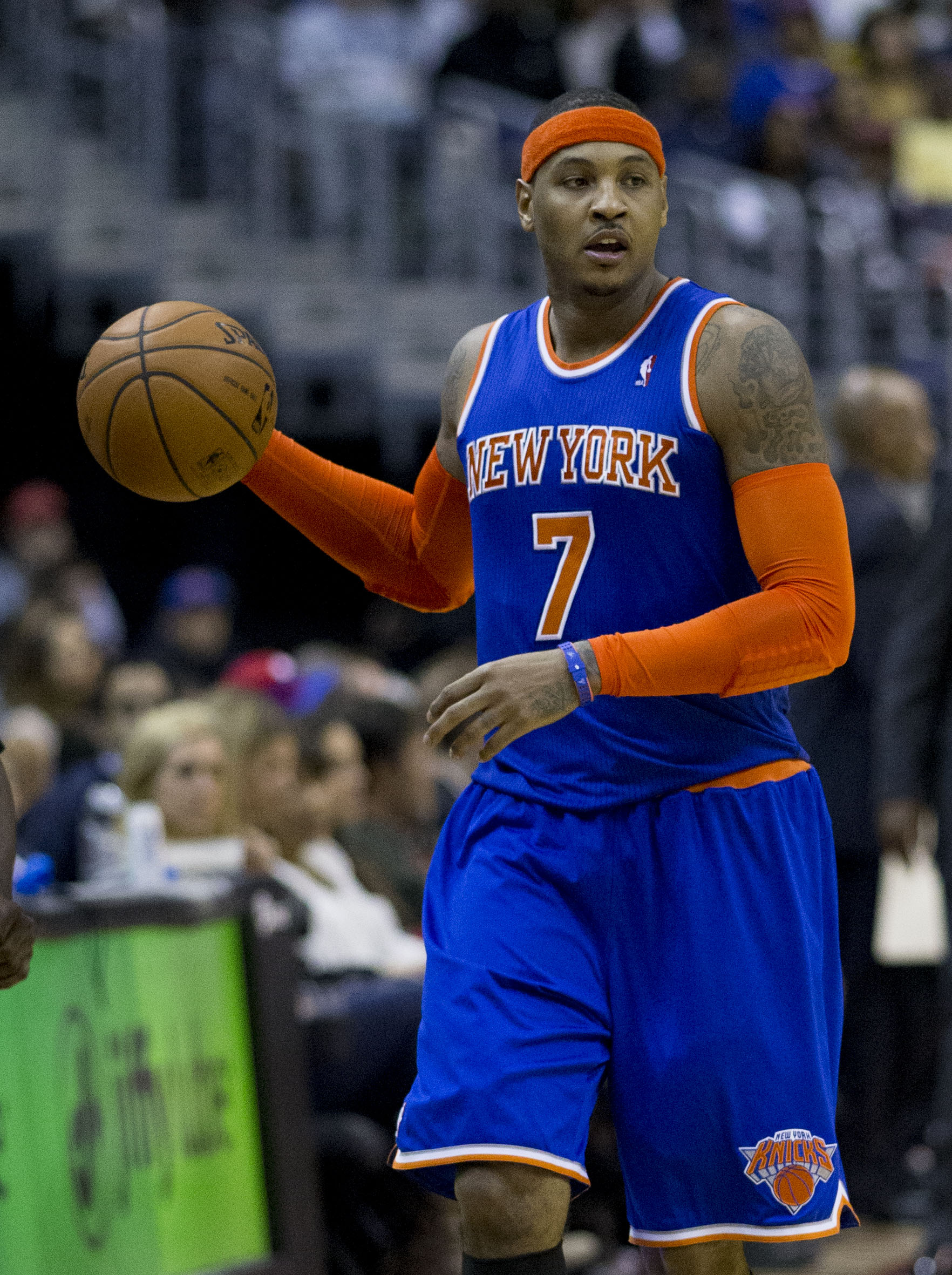
Carmelo Anthony with the New York Knicks

In 2006, McNamara would lead the Orange to an extremely unexpected Big East Championship victory, making the ninth-seeded Orange the lowest seed to ever win the championship and only the third school to repeat as Big East tournament champions, but was immediately defeated in the opening round of the 2006 NCAA tournament by Texas A&M, 66–58.

The 2007–08 season for the Orange was up and down. The Orange had a 50-point win over East Tennessee State on December 15, the largest margin of victory in 20 seasons. They recorded top-25 wins over Georgetown and Marquette. But the team lost to Villanova in the Big East tournament opening round, and to UMass in the NIT. UMass became the first team ever to beat the Orange twice in the same season at the Carrier Dome.

In the 2008–09 season Syracuse was led by sophomore guard Jonny Flynn. The team returned key players like Eric Devendorf, Andy Rautins, Rick Jackson, Arinze Onuaku and Paul Harris. Syracuse gained a tremendous amount of media attention following a 127–117 upset of UConn in six overtimes during the early morning hours of March 13, 2009 "the Game that wouldn't end" to advance to the semifinals of the Big East Conference tournament. This game solidified their seeding in the 2009 NCAA tournament. This game was the second longest of any game in NCAA History and only the fourth to make it into six overtimes. However, they lost in the Big East Final. Syracuse received a 3 seed and beat Stephen F. Austin 59–44 in the first round. Syracuse stamped its ticket to the Sweet 16 for the first time since 2004, defeating sixth seed Arizona State 78–67. However, the season ended with a loss to No. 2 seed Oklahoma, as the Sooners ended the Orange's season with an 84–71 loss.

At the start of the 2009–10 season, having lost three key players (Devendorf, Flynn, Harris) from the previous season, the Orange was not considered a top contender, unranked in the preseason AP Poll. An early exhibition game loss to local Le Moyne College, a Division II school, did little to improve the outlook. However, led by its starters, returning seniors Andy Rautins and Arinze Onuaku, junior Rick Jackson, a relatively unknown transfer from Iowa State University, forward Wes Johnson, freshman point guard Brandon Triche, plus standout reserve players, sophomores Kris Joseph and Scoop Jardine, the team began to deliver, winning its first 13 regular season games. By the second week of rankings, the Orange had climbed into the top ten, staying in the top five continuously from week 9. Syracuse reached a number one ranking two weeks before the season ended, finishing the season in fourth place with its best-ever regular season win–loss performance, at 28–3. It finished on top of the Big East for the regular season, losing in the Big East tournament's quarter finals. A 1-seed in the West Region of the 2010 NCAA tournament, the Orange fell in the Sweet Sixteen to 5-seed and AP #11 Butler to end the season 30–5.

Senior Big East Defensive player of the Year Rick Jackson and Juniors Kris Joseph and Scoop Jardine led the 2010–2011 Orange. Syracuse started strong by winning their first 18 contests before losing in Pittsburgh. That loss started a slide for the Orange, who lost six of their next eight games. The Orange regained their momentum by beating the West Virginia Mountaineers to start a six-game winning streak before losing in overtime to the Connecticut Huskies in the semi-finals of the Big East tournament. With a record of 28–7, the Orange garnered a #3 seed in the East Region of the NCAA tournament. The Orange easily handled Indiana State 77–60 in their first game. The Orange faced Marquette in the second round when one of the tournament's more controversial moments occurred. With the game tied at 59 with 51 seconds left, a backcourt violation was called on the Orange when Scoop Jardine retrieved Dion Waiters' inbound pass with one foot landing in the front court before his second settled in the backcourt. NCAA officiating coordinator John Adams admitted the call was made in error however; the officials were unaware of the full rule. According to the 2010 and 2011 NCAA Men's and Women's Basketball Rulebook, Rule 4, Section 3, Article 8 states: "After a jump ball or during a throw-in, the player in his/her front court, who makes the initial touch on the ball while both feet are off the playing court, may be the first to secure control of the ball and land with one or both feet in the back court. It makes no difference if the first foot down was in the front court or back court." Marquette guard Darius Johnson-Odom hit a three-pointer on the ensuing possession with 27 second left to give the Golden Eagles the lead for good and a spot to the Sweet Sixteen. The loss culminated a season in which SU remained undefeated outside of their conference for the first time in the program's history.

2012–13 was the school's last season in the Big East Conference. Led by sophomore point guard Michael Carter-Williams and Junior forward C.J. Fair, the team made its fifth trip to the Final Four.

=== Atlantic Coast Conference era (2013 – present) ===
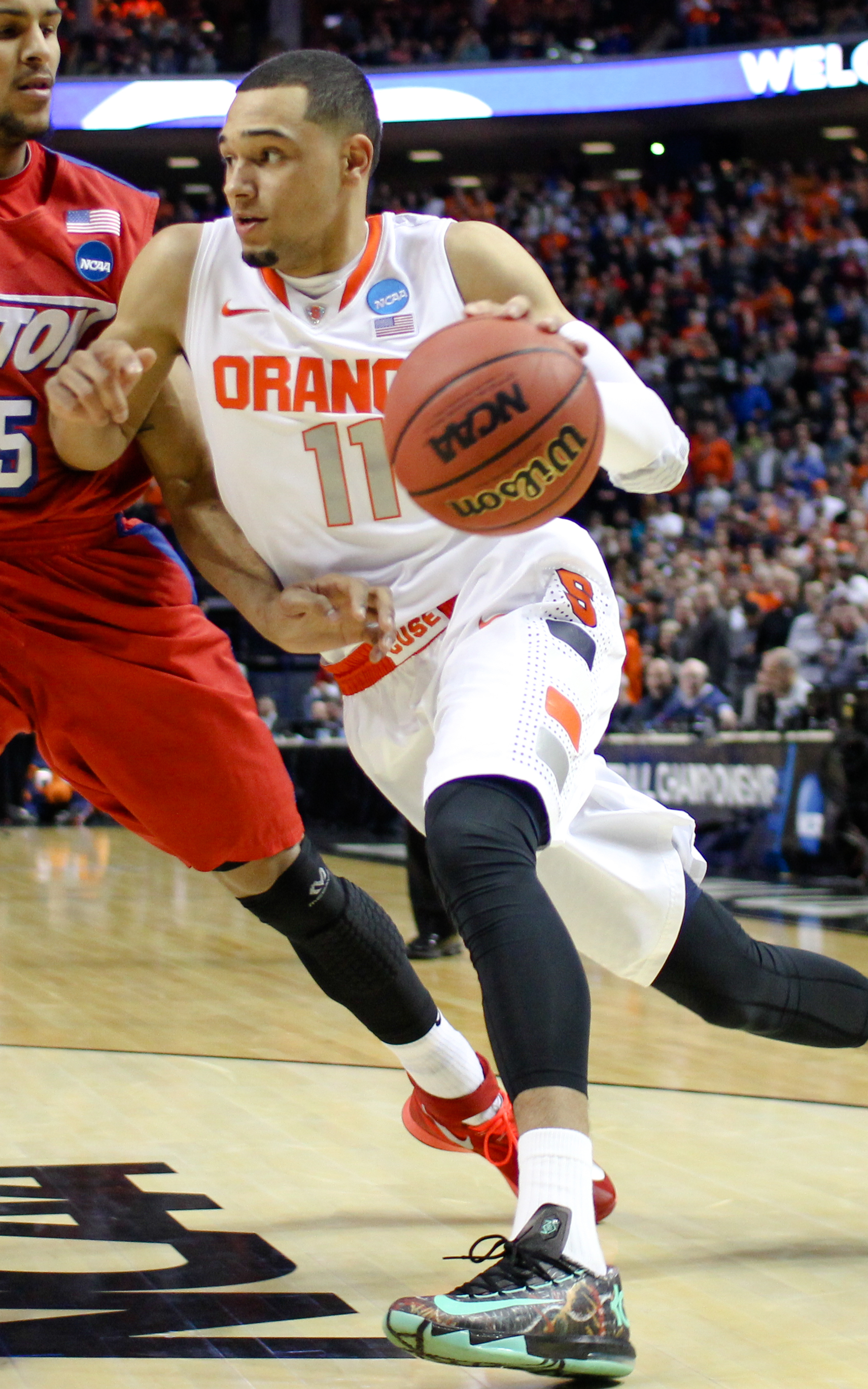
Tyler Ennis driving.

On July 1, 2013, Syracuse, Notre Dame and Pittsburgh joined the Atlantic Coast Conference (ACC). In its first season in the conference, Syracuse started 25–0 before losing six of its last nine games. The team featured two Second Team All Americans, point guard Tyler Ennis and forward C.J. Fair, and finished second in the ACC regular season standings.

The Orange underperformed 2014–15 expectations with an 18–13 record behind First Team All-ACC center Rakeem Christmas. Though the team was not eligible for the NCAA tournament due to the self-imposed post-season ban by the university, this would change in the following 2015–16 season as the Orange made the Final Four as a 10-seed by defeating Dayton, Middle Tennessee, Gonzaga, and Virginia.

The following season Syracuse started ranked 19th in the AP Poll, but failed to make the NCAA tournament. In the 2017–18 season Syracuse would return to the NCAA tournament despite going 8–10 in conference play. In the tournament Syracuse upset 3-seeded Michigan State before losing to Duke in the Sweet 16. The next year saw the Orange make back-to-back NCAA tournament appearances for the first time since the 2013–14 season. They lost to Baylor in the opening round. On January 14, 2019, Syracuse upset Duke in Cameron Indoor Stadium, marking the first time that the Blue Devils had lost to an unranked team at home as the AP ranked number one team. They would lose to Baylor in the opening round of the NCAA tournament. Syracuse started the 2019–20 season slow, losing 48–34 to Virginia, the lowest amount ever scored by a team in Boeheim's career. SU would win its final game of the season in the ACC tournament beating North Carolina 81–53 and defeating the Tar Heels for the first time since 2014. This would be the last game played due to the COVID-19 pandemic. In the 2020–21 season SU would once again upset its way to the Sweet 16 beating 3-seeded West Virginia before losing to eventual Final Four participant Houston.

== Syracuse University Athletics scandal ==
The NCAA's investigation into violations by Syracuse athletics date back to May 2007, following an initial report by the university to the NCAA, after the university learned that local YMCA employees paid some football and men's basketball student-athletes; Syracuse claims "the NCAA’s investigation of Syracuse has taken longer than any other investigation in NCAA history."

In March 2015, the NCAA released its infractions report which found that Syracuse had possibly violated rules. As a result, 101 wins were vacated by the NCAA in the 2004–2005, 2006–2007, 2010–2011, and 2011–2012 seasons.

The NCAA's ruling was confirmed by David Worlock, the NCAA's director of media coordination and statistics. Worlock is not part of the NCAA's Infractions or Enforcement offices. As the director of media coordination and statistics, he is working to update records based on the Committee on Infractions' sanctions. He said the COI's report on Syracuse differed from other investigations into violations at other schools in that it did not require the removal of championship trophies or banners signifying NCAA tournament appearances.

As a result, Syracuse retained the banner for its 2012 team's run to the NCAA Elite 8 and 2011 advancement to the third round of the NCAA tournament. Also, a Big East Conference official confirmed that the conference's updated media guide continues to list Syracuse as its 2005 and 2006 tournament champion.

== Coaches ==
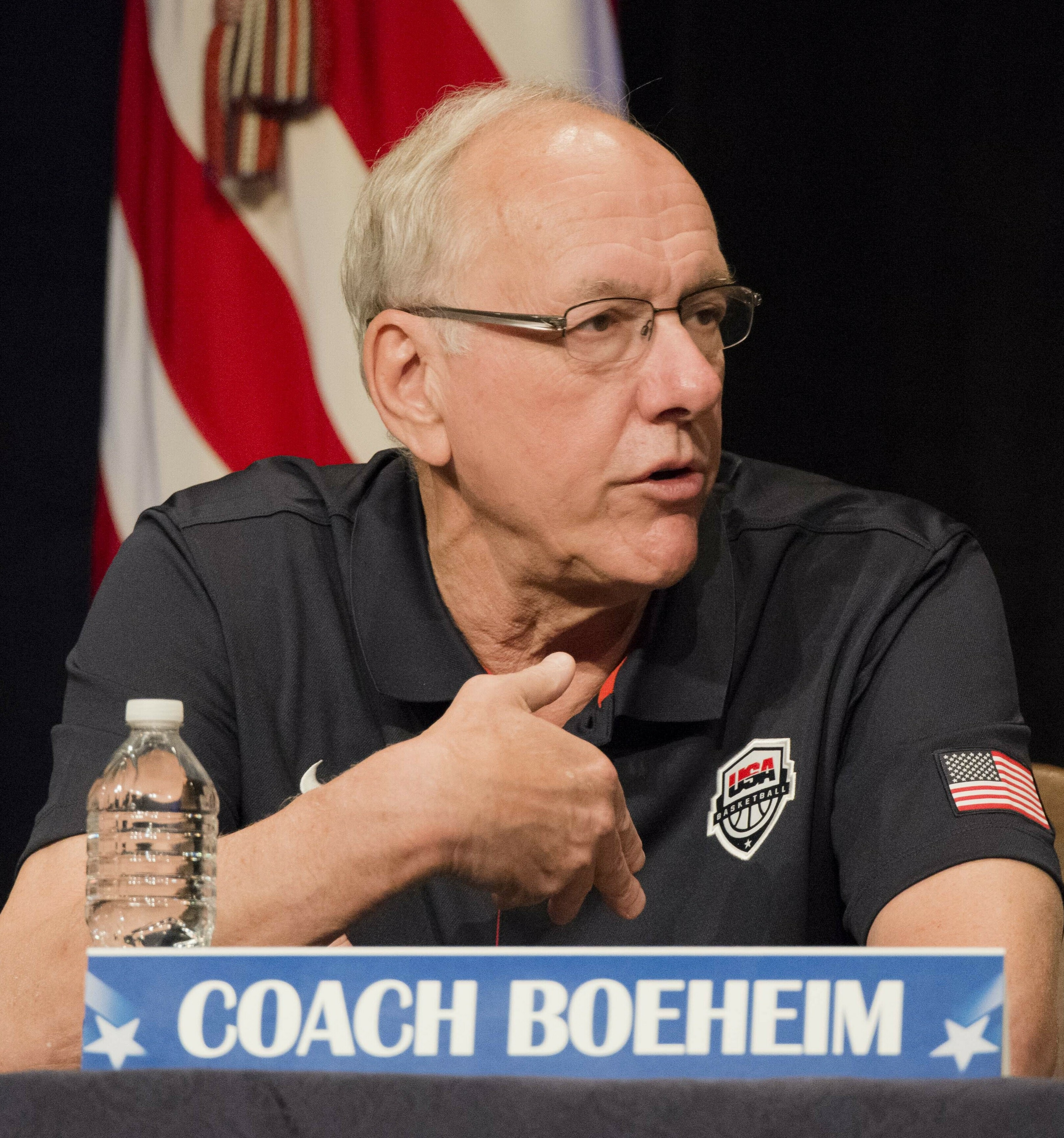
Jim Boeheim coached Syracuse's men's team from 1976–77 until 2022–23.

*	Naismith Basketball Hall of Fame inductee

Coach	Years	Win–loss	Win %	National champions	NCAA tourn. appearance
John A. R. Scott	1904–1911	66–54	.550	0	–
Edmund "Eddie" Dollard	1911–1924	151–59	.719	1	–
Lew Andreas	1924–1950	358–135	.726	1	–
Marc Guley	1950–1962	136–129	.513	0	1
Fred Lewis	1962–1968	91–57	.615	0	1
Roy Danforth	1968–1976	148–71	.676	0	4
Jim Boeheim*	1976–2023	1,116–440†	.717	1	35
Adrian Autry	2023–2026	49–48	.505	0	0

† including 101 victories vacated by NCAA

== Facilities ==
=== Archbold Gymnasium ===
Syracuse home games in the early years were played at Archbold Gymnasium, an on-campus gym that is still used for various university activities. It was built in 1908 with money donated by John Dustin Archbold, a major benefactor of the university, who also funded the building of Archbold Stadium, just to the west of the gymnasium (now the site of the Carrier Dome). After a 1947 fire, most home games were played at Syracuse's state fairgrounds' Coliseum and other local venues from 1947 to 1949.

=== Manley Field House ===
In 1962, home games moved to the newly constructed Manley Field House which finally gave the team a powerful home court advantage. At one time, the arena held 9,500 people for home games. The team became so fond of the space that its coaches objected to moving to the Carrier Dome when it was opened in 1980.

On February 13, 1980, the Georgetown Hoyas men's basketball team upset #2 ranked Syracuse 52–50 in the final planned, regular season game at Manley Field House, where the Orange boasted a 57-game home winning streak. Georgetown head coach John Thompson Jr. would declare after the victory during the news conference that "Manley Field House is officially closed". The game gave birth to a rivalry, not just between schools but between two contrasting future Hall of Fame coaches.

Manley Field House hosted the ECAC Upstate Region tournament organized by the Eastern College Athletic Conference (ECAC) in 1976 as well as a semifinal game of the 1977 ECAC South Region tournament.

=== Melo Center ===
The Carmelo K. Anthony Basketball Center is the home of Syracuse basketball. The $19 million facility officially opened in September 2009. The facility includes two NCAA regulation-size practice courts, a weight room, training room, equipment room, locker rooms and coaches offices for both men's and women's basketball programs. In addition, fans can relive some of the greatest moments in Syracuse basketball history in the building's Hall of Fame Wing. The name comes from NBA star forward Carmelo Anthony, who was the major benefactor to the project.

== Home court ==
=== The JMA Wireless Dome ===
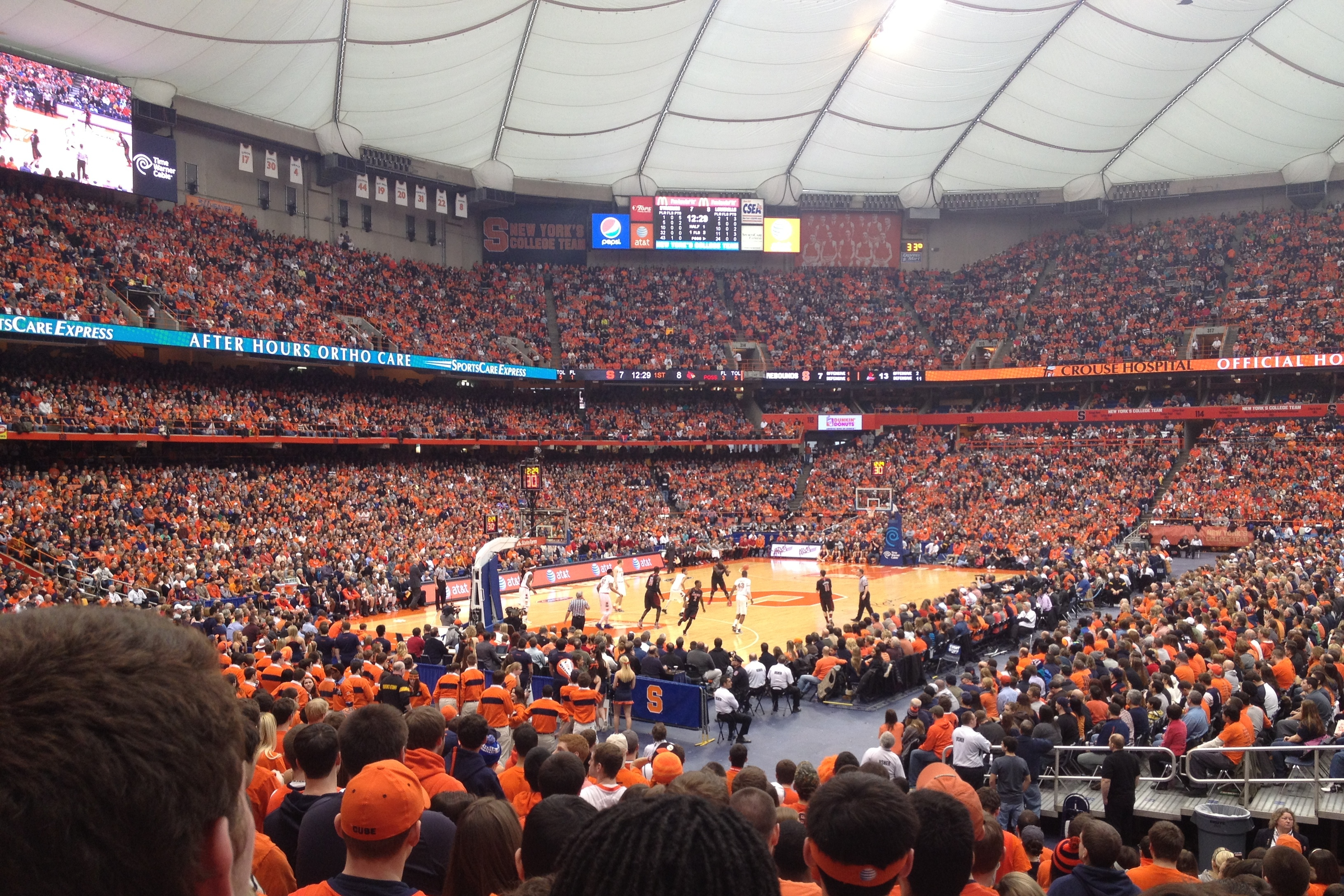
Carrier Dome, 2013 vs. Louisville

Because the Carrier Dome could not survive on a schedule of just 6 home football games a year, Syracuse Orange basketball team moved to their new home arena. In its setup for basketball, the Carrier Dome can hold crowds of more than 30,000 for its biggest games.

The Carrier Dome is the largest arena in NCAA DI basketball with a maximum capacity of 35,642. Syracuse's home court total attendance has led the nation 28 times, and its per-game average attendance has been ranked first 17 times since the opening of the Carrier Dome in 1980. Also, Syracuse has set and broken the NCAA on campus single game attendance record at the Carrier Dome 16 times. The most recent record-breaking game was against Duke in 2019 with a sellout crowd of 35,642 people.

In May 2018, the university announced a major renovation to the Carrier Dome as the central portion of a larger campus update. The renovation, estimated to cost $120 million, is expected to be completed in 2022. The most significant changes will be the replacement of the current air-supported roof with a fixed roof, two-thirds of which will be translucent, the installation of air conditioning and the largest centerhung videoboard in college sports. The upgrade will also include a new lighting and sound systems, Wi-Fi improvements, accessibility upgrades, improved restrooms, and new concession spaces.

=== Record breaking attendance ===
NCAA on campus attendance record breaking crowds in the Dome

Date	Opponent	Result	Score	Attendance
January 10, 1983	Georgetown	L	92–97	31,327
January 22, 1983	St. John's	L	57–68	32,382
December 10, 1983	North Carolina	L	64-87	32,435
February 1, 1985	Villanova	W	92–79	32,520
February 22, 1987	Georgetown	L	71–72	32,602
March 5, 1989	Georgetown	W	82–76	32,683
February 10, 1990	Connecticut	W	90–86	32,820
March 4, 1990	Georgetown	W	89–87	33,015
March 3, 1991	Georgetown	W	62–58	33,048
March 9, 2003	Rutgers	W	83–74	33,071
February 5, 2005	Notre Dame	W	60–57	33,199
March 5, 2006	Villanova	L	82–92	33,633
February 27, 2010	Villanova	W	95–77	34,616
February 23, 2013	Georgetown	L	46–57	35,012
February 1, 2014	Duke	W	91–89	35,446
February 14, 2015	Duke	L	72–80	35,446
February 23, 2019	Duke	L	65–75	35,642

=== Madison Square Garden ===
The Orange have been playing at Madison Square Garden since an encounter with Manhattan on February 1, 1939. The 2018–19 season marked the 37th consecutive campaign that Syracuse played at least once in the facility. The latest streak began in 1983–84.

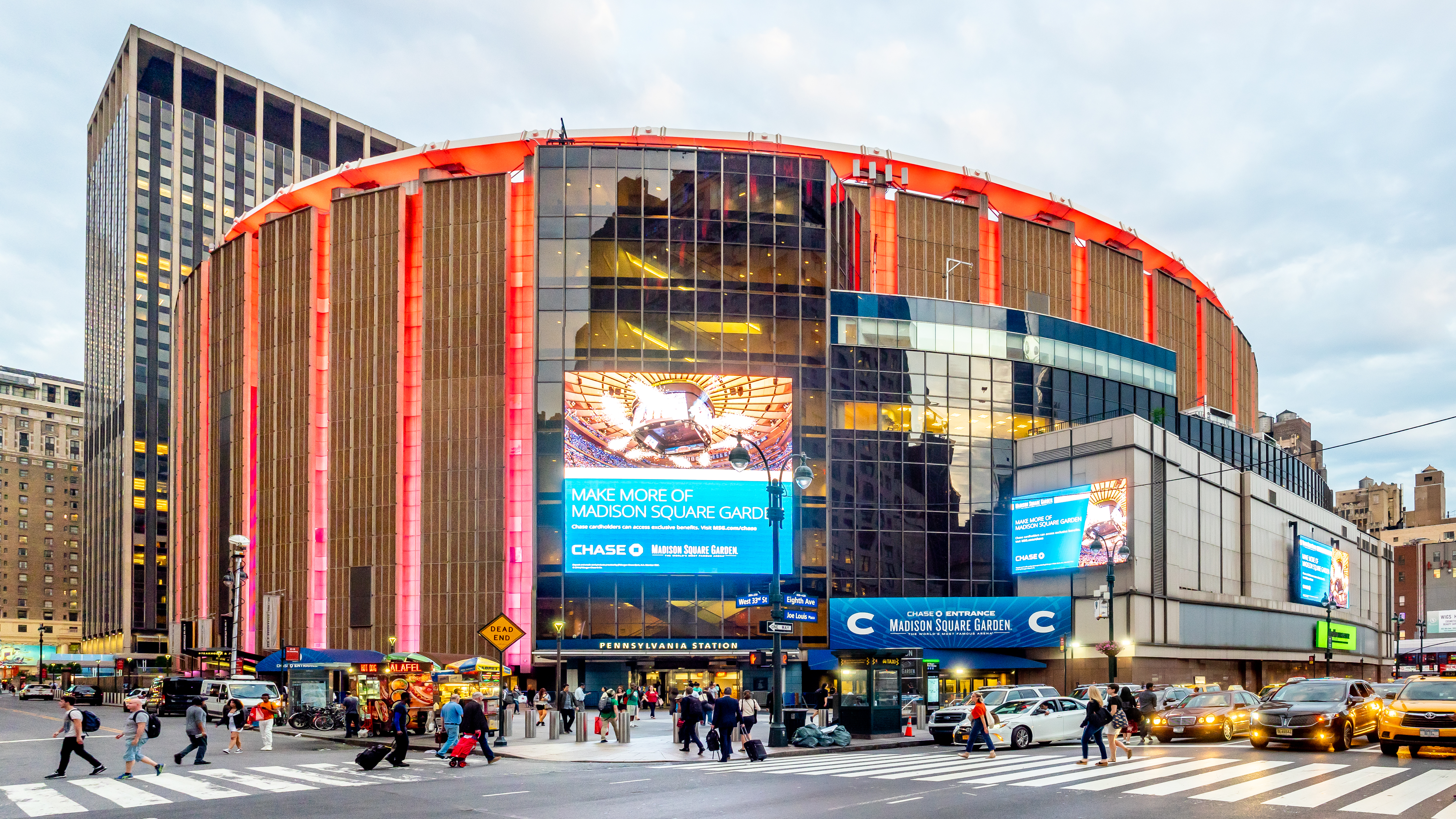
Madison Square Garden in New York City

Syracuse at Madison Square Garden
Games	Record
Overall	95–79
Regular season	45–42
Big East tournament	46–27
NIT	3–9
NCAA	1–0

* record stands as of December 18, 2018, and does not reflect wins vacated by the NCAA from 2004 to 2007 and 2010 to 2012.

== Rivalries ==
The original Big East was founded by seven charter schools in 1979 (Providence, St. John's, Georgetown, Syracuse, Seton Hall, Connecticut, and Boston College). Villanova joined the following year, followed by Pittsburgh in 1982. Throughout the 1980s and early 1990s, Georgetown, Villanova, St. John's, and Syracuse were the primary powers in the conference with UConn joining them in the 1990s. In less than a decade after its inception, the Big East became the most successful college basketball league in America. The documentary 30 for 30: Requiem For The Big East by ESPN Films chronicles well the meteoric ascension of the Big East conference.

=== Syracuse and Georgetown rivalry ===
Syracuse and Georgetown rivalry — Syracuse's biggest rival is Georgetown. The two schools have been playing each other since 1930, but their rivalry was solidified in the 1980s as the respective programs were the leading powers during the infancy of the newly formed Big East conference. On February 13, 1980, the Georgetown Hoyas men's basketball team upset #2 ranked Syracuse 52–50 in the final planned, regular season game at Manley Field House, where the Orange boasted a 57-game home winning streak. Georgetown head coach John Thompson Jr. would declare after the victory during the news conference that "Manley Field House is officially closed". The game gave birth to a rivalry, not just between schools but between two contrasting future Hall of Fame coaches.

The Georgetown–Syracuse rivalry has included incidents such as Michael Graham's punch during the Big East tournament at Madison Square Garden in New York City; Pearl Washington's buzzer-beating shot against the defending national champion and top-ranked team in the country at the Carrier Dome; and coach Thompson's three technical fouls and subsequent ejection during the controversial Orange victory.

The animosity between the programs was further extended when Syracuse announced their decision to leave the Big East effective in 2013 to join the ACC. Georgetown and Syracuse have continued to play each other in the next years following their exit from the conference.

The Georgetown–Syracuse rivalry is regarded as one of college basketball's greatest rivalries between two storied programs.

=== Syracuse and Connecticut rivalry ===
The first game played between the two schools took place on January 27, 1956, while the rivalry was at its height from 1979 to 2013 when both teams were members of the Big East Conference. The rivalry featured two Hall of Fame coaches, Jim Boeheim and Jim Calhoun. One of the highlights was the historic Big East tournament quarterfinal game in 2009, which took place at Madison Square Garden in New York City. Syracuse won 127–117 in a game that went to six overtimes, ending at 1:22 AM.

=== Syracuse and Villanova rivalry ===
Syracuse and Villanova rivalry — Both schools have strong basketball traditions and are former Big East rivals. The strength of the basketball rivalry is evidenced by the fact that Syracuse v. Villanova games have attracted some of the biggest college basketball crowds ever, breaking the NCAA on campus basketball attendance record twice, including one game with a crowd of 34,616 people in 2010. However, this rivalry has an uncertain future because of the schools' recent separation (Syracuse in the ACC, and Villanova in the new Big East).

The Orange lead all-time series with each of their rivals.

Opponent	Wins	Losses	Pct.
Georgetown	52	44	.541
Connecticut	53	37	.588
Villanova	39	33	.542
St. John's	52	43	.547

Updated December 18, 2022

== Championships ==
=== Post-season success ===
National Championships
Syracuse; University; Basketball; National; Champions; 1918	Syracuse; University; Basketball; National; Champions; 1926	Syracuse; University; NCAA; Basketball; Champions; 2003

NCAA Final Fours
Syracuse; University; NCAA; Final Four; 1975	Syracuse; University; NCAA; Champion; Runner-Up; 1987	Syracuse; University; NCAA; Champion; Runner-Up; 1996	Syracuse; University; NCAA; Basketball; Champions; 2003	Syracuse; University; NCAA; Final Four; 2013	Syracuse; University; NCAA; Final Four; 2016

1975 NCAA Tournament results
Round	Opponent	Score
Round of 32	La Salle	87*–83
Sweet Sixteen	North Carolina	78–76
Elite Eight	Kansas State	95*–87
Final Four	Kentucky	79–95
3rd Place Game	Louisville	88–96*

1987 NCAA Tournament results
Round	Opponent	Score
Round of 64	Georgia Southern	79–73
Round of 32	Western Kentucky	104–86
Sweet Sixteen	Florida	87–81
Elite Eight	North Carolina	79–75
Final Four	Providence	77–63
National Finals	Indiana	73–74

1996 NCAA Tournament results
Round	Opponent	Score
Round of 64	Montana State	88–55
Round of 32	Drexel	69–58
Sweet Sixteen	Georgia	83*–81
Elite Eight	Kansas	60–57
Final Four	Mississippi State	77–69
National Finals	Kentucky	67–76

2003 NCAA Tournament results
Round	Opponent	Score
Round of 64	Manhattan	76–65
Round of 32	Oklahoma State	68–56
Sweet Sixteen	Auburn	79–78
Elite Eight	Oklahoma	63–47
Final Four	Texas	95–84
National Finals	Kansas	81–78

2013 NCAA Tournament results
Round	Opponent	Score
Round of 64	Montana	81–34
Round of 32	California	66–60
Sweet Sixteen	Indiana	61–50
Elite Eight	Marquette	55–39
Final Four	Michigan	56–61

2016 NCAA Tournament results
Round	Opponent	Score
Round of 64	Dayton	70–51
Round of 32	Middle Tennessee	75–50
Sweet Sixteen	Gonzaga	63–60
Elite Eight	Virginia	68–62
Final Four	North Carolina	66–83

=== NCAA tournament seeding ===
The NCAA began seeding the tournament with the 1979 edition.

Years →	'79	'80	'81	'83	'84	'85	'86	'87	'88	'89	'90	'91	'92	'94	'95	'96	'98	'99	'00
Seeds →	4	1	6	3	5	7	2	2	3	2	2	2	6	4	7	4	5	8	4

Years →	'01	'03	'04	'05	'06	'09	'10	'11	'12	'13	'14	'16	'18	'19	'21
Seeds →	5	3	6	4	5	3	1	3	1	4	3	10	11^{*}	8	11

* played in the "First Four" round

=== Complete NCAA tournament results ===
The Orange have appeared in the NCAA tournament 41 times. Their combined record is 70–41.

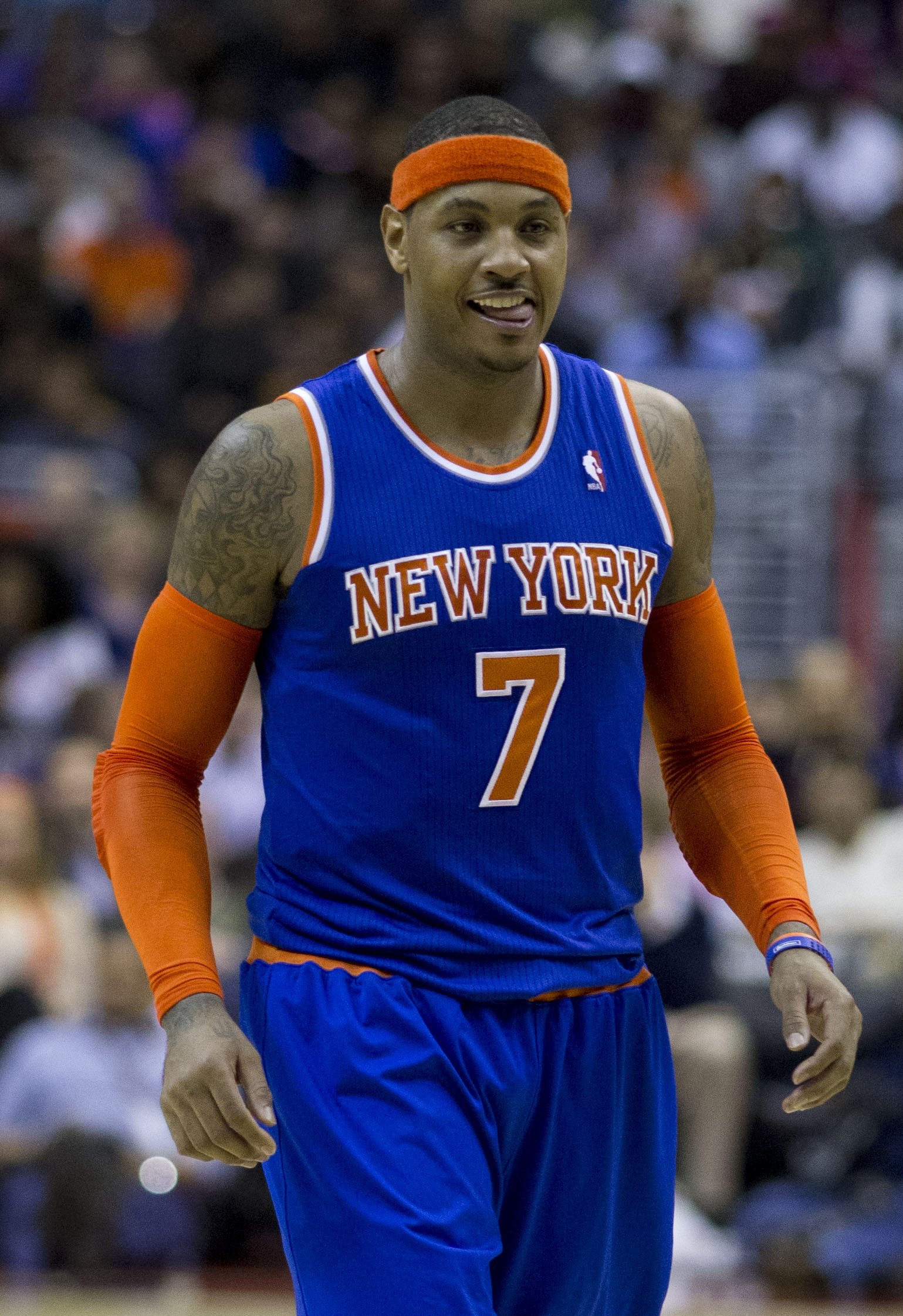
Carmelo Anthony with the Knicks

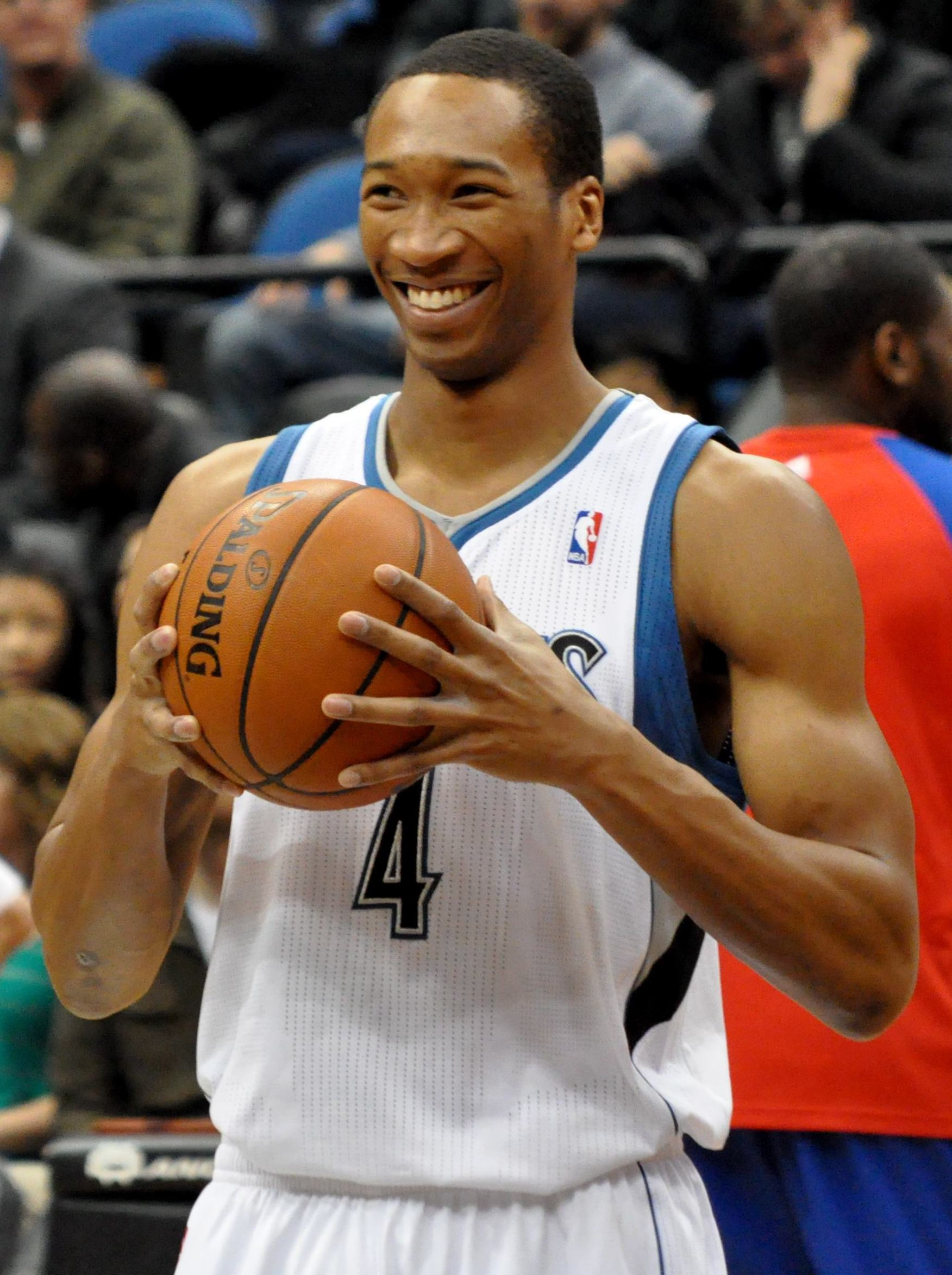
Wesley Johnson

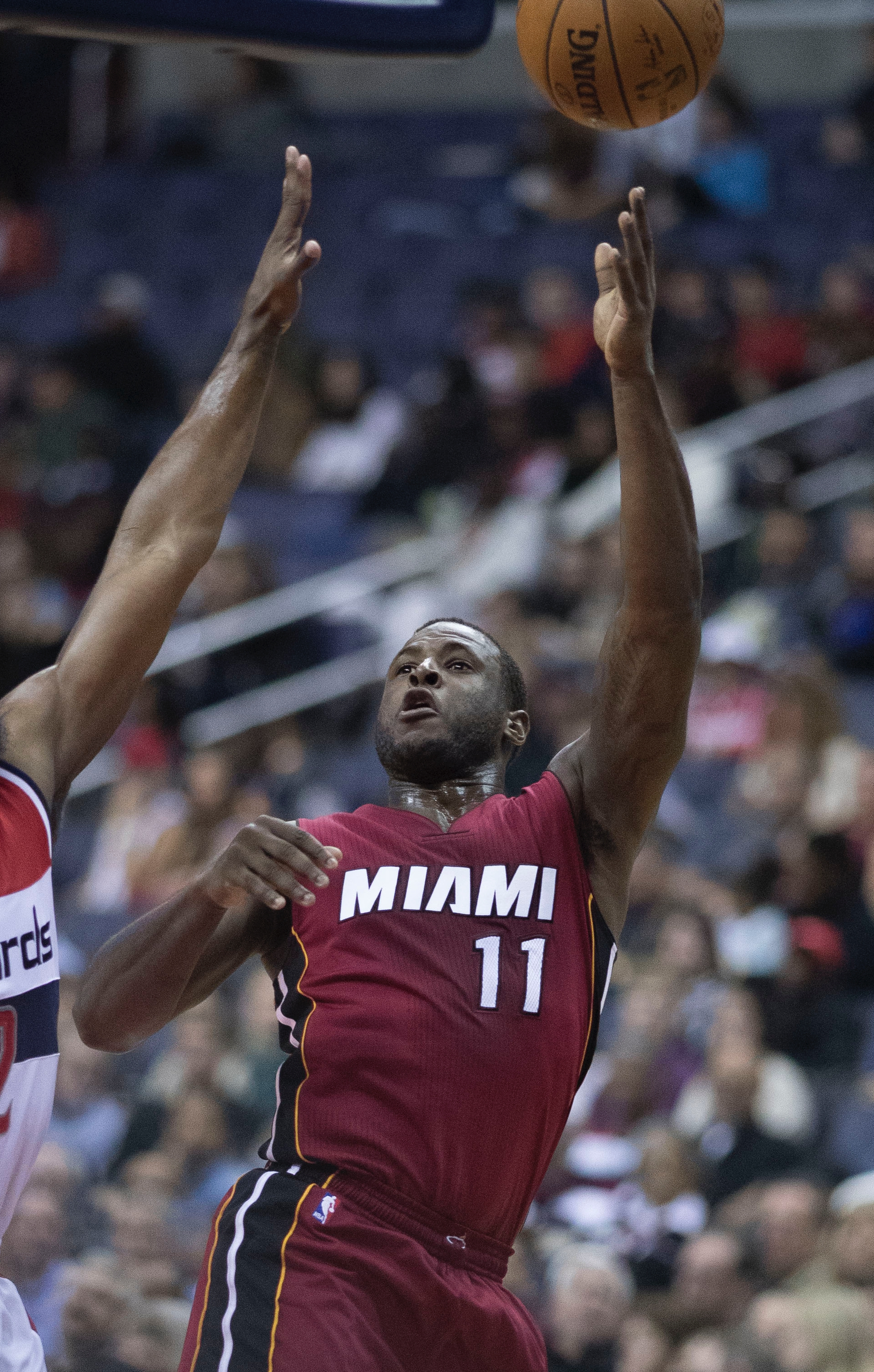
Dion Waiters

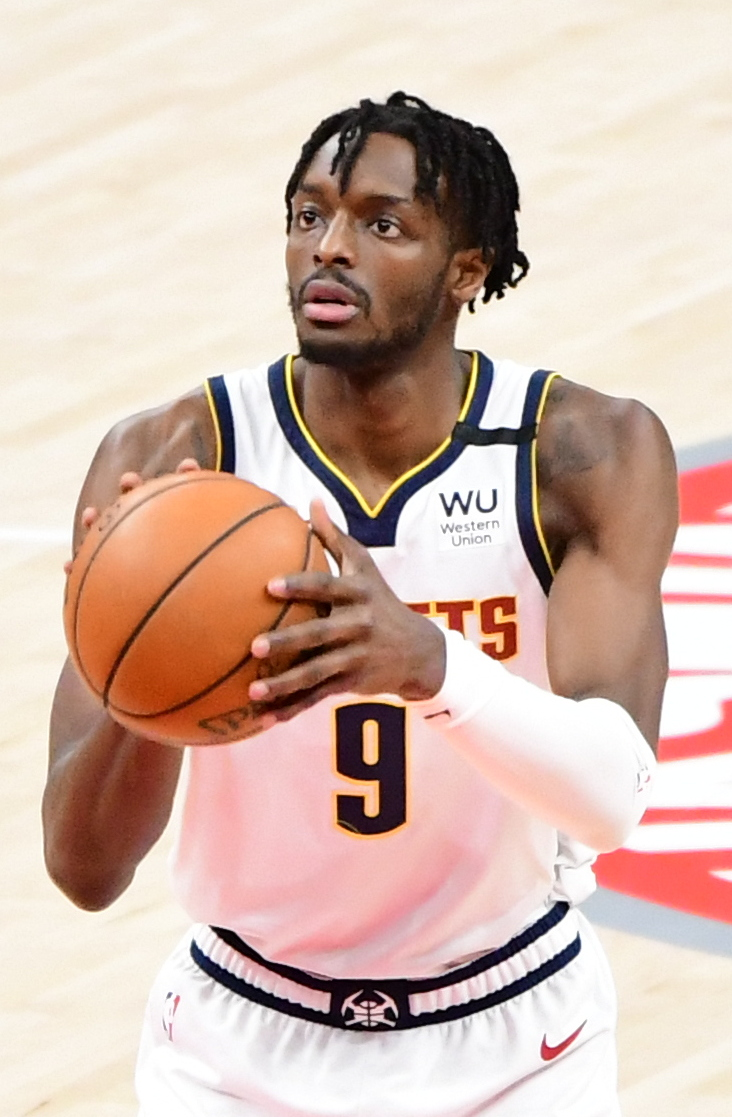
Jerami Grant

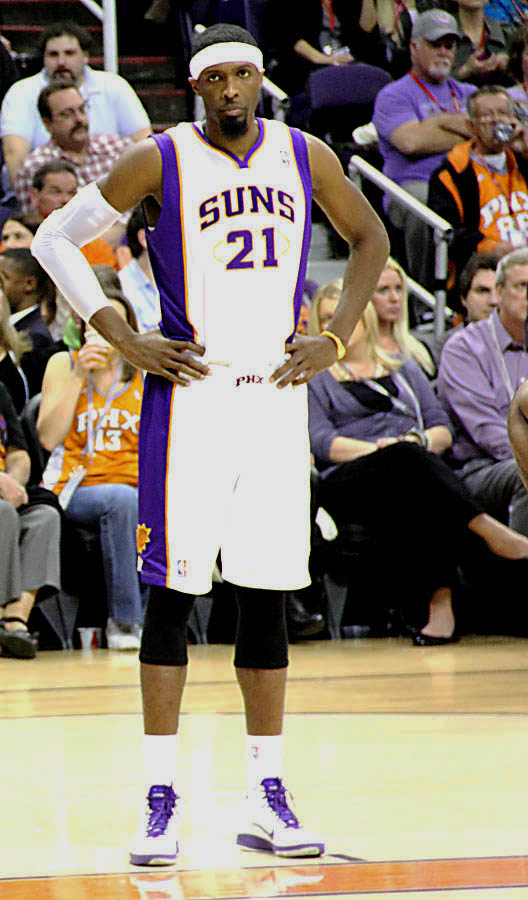
Hakim Warrick

NCAA Champions
NCAA Runner-up
NCAA Final 4

Year	Seed	Round	Opponent	Result
1957		First round Sweet Sixteen; Elite Eight	Connecticut; Lafayette; North Carolina	W 82–76; W 75–71; L 58–67
1966		Sweet Sixteen; Elite Eight	Davidson; Duke	W 94–78; L 81–91
1973		First round Sweet Sixteen; Regional third place game	Furman; Maryland; Penn	W 83–82; L 75–91; W 69–68
1974		First round	Oral Roberts	L 82–86^{OT}
1975		First round Sweet Sixteen; Elite Eight; Final Four; National third place game	La Salle; North Carolina; Kansas State; Kentucky; Louisville	W 87–83^{OT} W 78–76; W 95–87^{OT} L 79–95; L 88–96^{OT}
1976		First round	Texas Tech	L 56–69
1977		First round Sweet Sixteen	Tennessee; Charlotte	W 93–88^{OT} L 59–81
1978		First round	WKU	L 86–87^{OT}
1979	#4	Second round Sweet Sixteen	#5 Connecticut #9 Penn	W 89–81; L 76–84
1980	#1	Second round Sweet Sixteen	#8 Villanova #5 Iowa	W 97–83; L 77–88
1983	#6	First round Second round	#11 Morehead State #3 Ohio State	W 74–59; L 74–79
1984	#3	Second round Sweet Sixteen	#6 VCU #7 Virginia	W 78–63; L 55–63
1985	#7	First round Second round	#10 DePaul #2 Georgia Tech	W 70–65; L 53–70
1986	#2	First round Second round	#15 Brown #7 Navy	W 101–52; L 85–97
1987	#2	First round Second round Sweet Sixteen; Elite Eight; Final Four; National Championship	#15 Georgia Southern #10 WKU #6 Florida #1 North Carolina #6 Providence #1 Indiana	W 79–73; W 104–86; W 87–81; W 79–75; W 77–63; L 74–73
1988	#3	First round Second round	#14 North Carolina A&T #11 Rhode Island	W 69–55; L 94–97
1989	#2	First round Second round Sweet Sixteen; Elite Eight	#15 Bucknell #10 Colorado State #3 Missouri #1 Illinois	W 104–81; W 65–50; W 83–80; L 86–89
1990	#2	First round Second round Sweet Sixteen	#15 Coppin State #7 Virginia #6 Minnesota	W 70–48; W 63–61; L 75–82
1991	#2	First round	#15 Richmond	L 73–69
1992	#6	First round Second round	#11 Princeton #3 Massachusetts	W 51–43; L 71–77
1994	#4	First round Second round Sweet Sixteen	#13 Hawaiʻi #12 Green Bay #1 Missouri	W 92–78; W 64–59; L 88–98^{OT}
1995	#7	First round Second round	#10 Southern Illinois #2 Arkansas	W 96–92; L 94–96^{OT}
1996	#4	First round Second round Sweet Sixteen; Elite Eight; Final Four; National Championship	#13 Montana State #12 Drexel #8 Georgia #2 Kansas #5 Mississippi State #1 Kentucky	W 88–55; W 69–58; W 83–81^{OT} W 60–57; W 77–69; L 67–76
1998	#5	First round Second round Sweet Sixteen	#12 Iona #4 New Mexico #1 Duke	W 63–61; W 56–46; L 80–67
1999	#8	First round	#9 Oklahoma State	L 61–69
2000	#4	First round Second round Sweet Sixteen	#13 Samford #5 Kentucky #1 Michigan State	W 79–65; W 52–50; L 58–75
2001	#5	First round Second round	#12 Hawaiʻi #4 Kansas	W 79–69; L 58–87
2003	#3	First round Second round Sweet Sixteen; Elite Eight; Final Four; National Championship	#14 Manhattan #6 Oklahoma State #10 Auburn #1 Oklahoma #1 Texas #2 Kansas	W 76–65; W 68–56; W 79–78; W 63–47; W 95–84; W 81–78
2004	#5	First round Second round Sweet Sixteen	#12 BYU #4 Maryland #8 Alabama	W 80–75; W 72–70; L 71–80
2005†	#4	First round	#13 Vermont	L 57–60^{OT}
2006†	#5	First round	#12 Texas A&M	L 58–66
2009	#3	First round Second round Sweet Sixteen	#14 Stephen F. Austin #6 Arizona State #2 Oklahoma	W 59–44; W 78–67; L 71–84
2010	#1	First round Second round Sweet Sixteen	#16 Vermont #8 Gonzaga #5 Butler	W 79–56; W 87–65; L 59–63
2011†	#3	Second round Third round	#14 Indiana State #11 Marquette	W 77–60; L 62–66
2012†	#1	Second round Third round Sweet Sixteen; Elite Eight	#16 UNC Asheville #8 Kansas State #4 Wisconsin #2 Ohio State	W 72–65; W 75–59; W 64–63; L 70–77
2013	#4	Second round Third round Sweet Sixteen; Elite Eight; Final Four	#13 Montana #12 California #1 Indiana #3 Marquette #4 Michigan	W 81–34; W 66–60; W 61–50; W 55–39; L 56–61
2014	#3	Second round Third round	#14 Western Michigan #11 Dayton	W 77–53; L 53–55
2016	#10	First round Second round Sweet Sixteen; Elite Eight; Final Four	#7 Dayton #15 Middle Tennessee State #11 Gonzaga #1 Virginia #1 North Carolina	W 70–51; W 75–50; W 63–60; W 68–62; L 66–83
2018	#11	First Four; First round Second round Sweet Sixteen	#11 Arizona State #6 TCU #3 Michigan State #2 Duke	W 60–56; W 57–52; W 55–53; L 65–69
2019	#8	First round	#9 Baylor	L 69–78
2021	#11	First round Second round Sweet Sixteen	#6 San Diego State #3 West Virginia #2 Houston	W 78–62; W 75–72; L 46–62

- – Following the introduction of the "First Four" round in 2011, the Round of 64 and Round of 32 were referred to as the second round and third round, respectively, from 2011 to 2015. Then from 2016 moving forward, the Round 64 and Round of 32 will be called the First and Second rounds, as they were prior to 2011.
† – All NCAA tournament wins in 2005, 2006, 2011, and 2012 were vacated by the NCAA in its March 2015 report of Infractions on its athletics department. See Syracuse University athletics scandal.

As a result of the COVID-19 pandemic, the 2020 NCAA tournament was cancelled.

=== NIT results ===
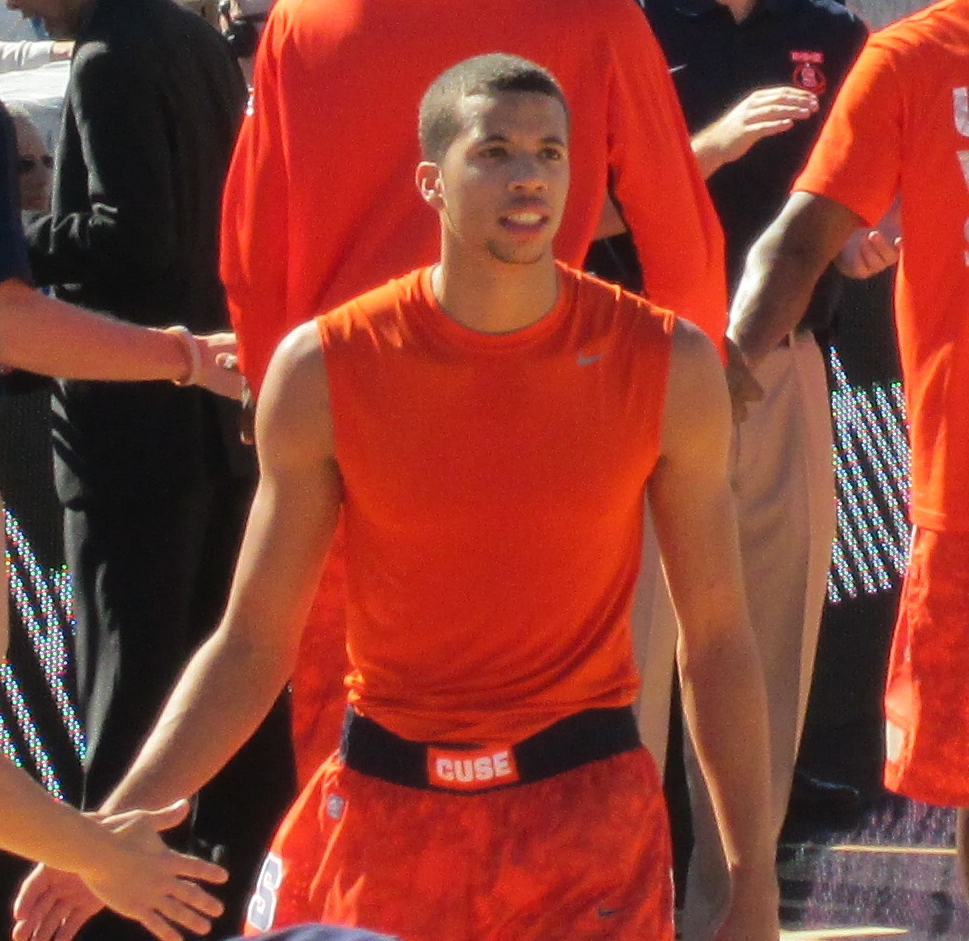
Michael Carter-Williams

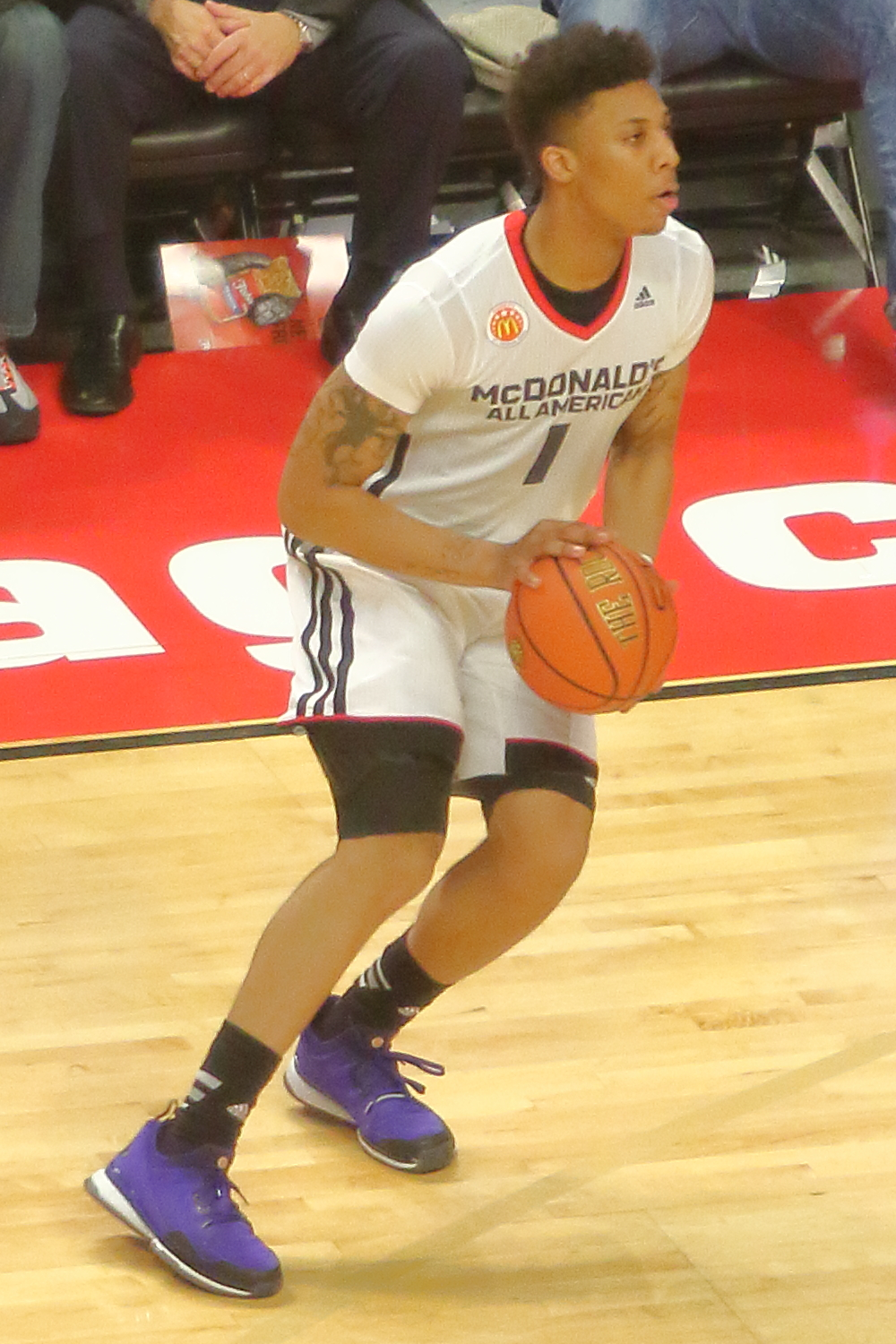
Malachi Richardson

The Orange have appeared in the National Invitation Tournament (NIT) 13 times.

Year	Round	Opponent	Result
1946	Quarterfinals	Muhlenberg	L 41–47
1950	First round Quarterfinals	Long Island; Bradley	W 80–52; L 66–78
1964	First round	NYU	L 68–77
1967	First round	New Mexico	L 64–66
1971	First round	Michigan	L 76–86
1972	First round Second round	Davidson; Maryland	W 81–77; L 65–71
1981	First round Second round Quarterfinals; Semifinals; Final	Marquette; Holy Cross; Michigan; Purdue; Tulsa	W 88–81; W 77–75; W 91–76; W 70–63; L 84–86
1982	First round Second round	Saint Peter's; Bradley	W 84–75; L 81–95
1997	First round	Florida State	L 67–82
2002	First round Second round Quarterfinals; Semifinals; 3rd Place Game	St. Bonaventure; Butler; Richmond; South Carolina; Temple	W 76–66; W 66–65; W 62–46; L 59–66; L 64–65
2007*	First round Second round Quarterfinals	South Alabama; San Diego State; Clemson	W 79–73; W 80–64; L 70–74
2008	First round Second round Quarterfinals	Robert Morris; Maryland; Massachusetts	W 87–81; W 88–72; L 77–81
2017	First round Second round	UNC Greensboro; Ole Miss	W 90–77; L 80–85

* – all wins in 2007 NIT were vacated as a result of the 2015 investigation of its athletics department.

=== National Campus Basketball Tournament results ===
The Orange appeared in the only National Campus Basketball Tournament where they were champions with a record of 3–0.

Year	Round	Opponent	Result
1951	Quarterfinals; Semifinals; Final	Toledo; Utah; Bradley	W 69–52; W 74–57; W 76–75

=== Conference tournament titles ===
Since its beginnings in 1898, Syracuse had been independent program until it joined the Big East Conference in 1979. From 1975 to 1982, the Eastern College Athletic Conference (ECAC) organized annual regional end-of-season men's basketball tournaments for independent Division I ECAC member colleges and universities in the Northeastern United States. The winner of each regional tournament was declared the ECAC regional champion for the season and received an automatic bid in the NCAA Division I men's basketball tournament. In 2013, Syracuse joined the Atlantic Coast Conference.

Year	Coach	Conference	Overall record	Conference record
1974–75	Roy Danforth	ECAC Upstate	23–9	–
1975–76	Roy Danforth	ECAC Upstate	20–9	–
1976–77	Jim Boeheim	ECAC Southern	26–4	–
1980–81	Jim Boeheim	Big East	22–12	6–8
1987–88	Jim Boeheim	Big East	22–9	11–5
1991–92	Jim Boeheim	Big East	22–10	11–8
2004–05†	Jim Boeheim	Big East	27–7	11–5
2005–06†	Jim Boeheim	Big East	23–12	7–9
Total Conference tournament Titles: 8

† – Indicates season for which the school's overall and/or conference record has been later adjusted by penalty, however the titles are claimed by the university

=== Conference regular-season champions ===
Syracuse had been independent program until it joined the Big East Conference in 1979. In 2013, Syracuse joined the Atlantic Coast Conference.

Year	Coach	Conference	Overall record	Conference record
1979–80	Jim Boeheim	Big East	26–4	5–1
1985–86	Jim Boeheim	Big East	26–6	14–2
1986–87	Jim Boeheim	Big East	31–7	12–4
1989–90	Jim Boeheim	Big East	26–7	12–4
1990–91	Jim Boeheim	Big East	22–6	12–4
1997–98	Jim Boeheim	Big East 7	26–9	12–6
1999–00	Jim Boeheim	Big East	26–6	13–3
2002–03	Jim Boeheim	Big East	30–5	13–3
2009–10	Jim Boeheim	Big East	30–5	15–3
2011–12†	Jim Boeheim	Big East	34–3	17–1
Total Conference regular season Titles: 10

† – Indicates season for which the school's overall and/or conference record has been later adjusted by penalty, but the titles are claimed by the university

== National polls ==
Syracuse has finished in the Final Top 25 rankings 30 times in the AP Poll. Syracuse teams have spent a total of 17 weeks ranked number 1, most recently in 2014.

Syracuse Final rankings

Year	Record	AP Poll†
1966	21–5	16^
1973	24–5	14
1975	23–9	6
1977	26–4	6
1979	26–4	8
1980	26–4	6
1984	23–9	18
1985	22–9	15
1986	26–6	9
1987	31–7	10
1988	26–9	9
1989	30–8	7
1990	26–7	6
1991	26–6	7
1992	22–10	21
1994	23–7	15

Year	Record	AP Poll
1995	20–10	25
1996	29–9	15
1998	26–9	21
2000	26–6	16
2001	25–9	17
2003	30–5	13
2004	23–8	20
2005	27–7	11
2006	23–12	21
2009	28–10	13
2010	30–5	4
2011	27–8	12
2012	34–3	2
2013	30–10	16
2014	28–6	14

Year	Record	AP Poll
2016	23–14	10^
2021	18–10	25^

† The Associated Press began compiling a ranking of the top 20 college men's basketball teams during the 1948–1949 season. It has issued the poll continuously since the 1950–1951 season. Beginning with the 1989–1990 season, the poll expanded to 25 teams.
^ Final ballot of The Coaches Poll. (The second oldest poll still in use after the AP Poll).

== Notable players and coaches ==
=== Retired jerseys ===
Syracuse University honors jersey/uniform numbers of its athletes, but the numbers are not officially "retired" and remain active. Historically, Syracuse University has restricted the men's basketball team from wearing such numbers, but there have also been exceptions to this custom. An example of the former is Carmelo Anthony, who wore #22 in high school, but since the number was already "retired" at Syracuse, Anthony chose #15 as an alternate upon his arrival. Similarly, Gerry McNamara wore #31 in high school, also "retired" by Syracuse University (McNamara chose #3 instead).

Syracuse Orange basketball retired numbers

Hakim Warrick; 2001–2005

Gerry McNamara; 2002–2006

Rony Seikaly; 1984–1988

Vic Hanson; 1924–1927

Carmelo Anthony; 2002–2003

Billy Gabor; 1942–1943, '45–'48

Wilmeth Sidat-Singh; 1935–1938

Sherman Douglas; 1985–1989

Lawrence Moten; 1991–1995

Dave Bing; 1963–1966

Dennis DuVal; 1971–1974

Billy Owens; 1988–1991

Pearl Washington; 1983–1986

Derrick Coleman; 1986–1990

John Wallace; 1992–1996

Roosevelt Bouie; 1976–1980

Louis Orr; 1976–1980

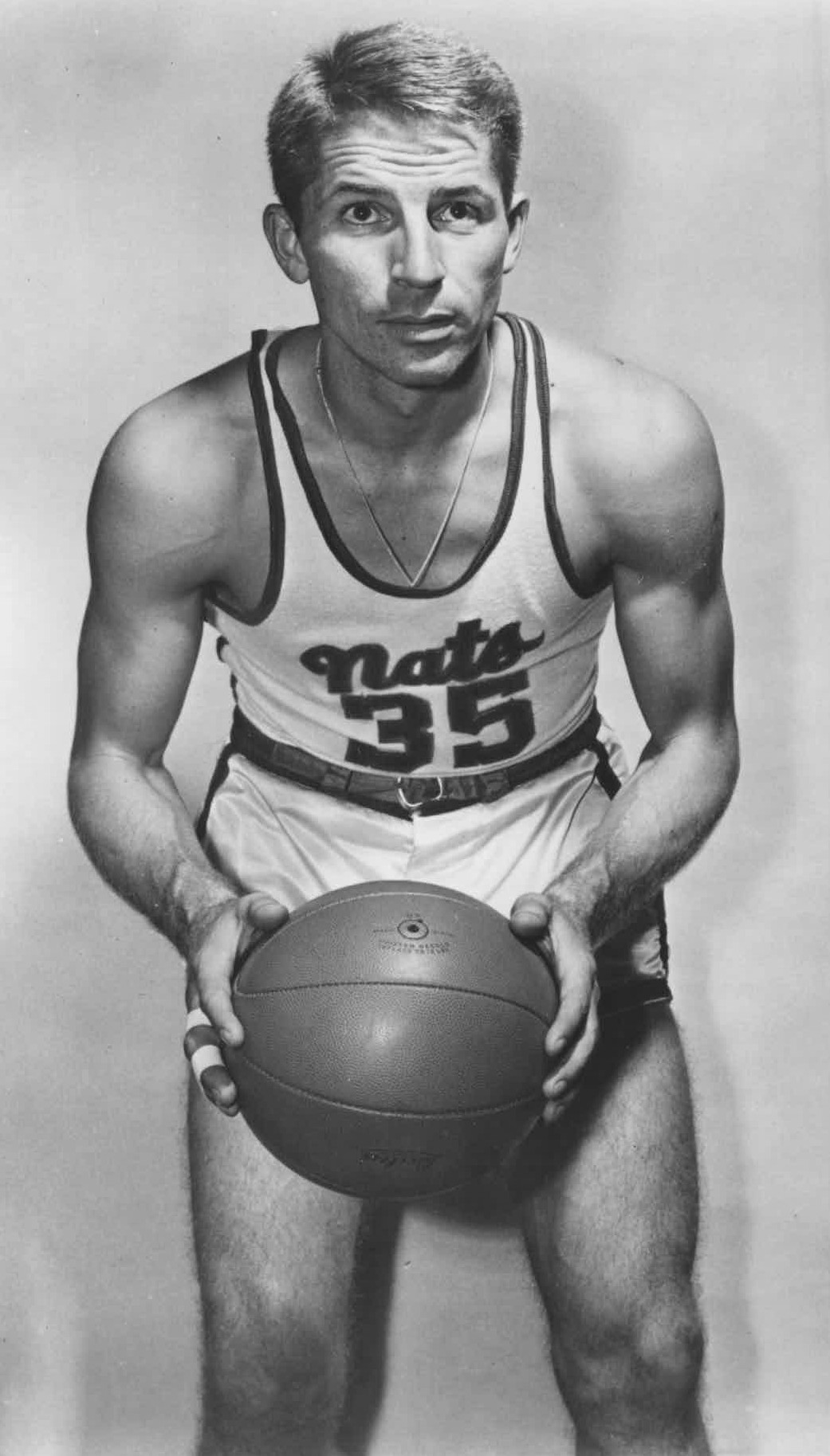
Billy Gabor's No. 17 was retired

=== The Naismith Memorial Basketball Hall of Fame ===
Name	Pos.	Years	Inducted
Vic Hanson	Forward	1924–1927	1960
Dave Bing	Guard	1963–1966	1990
Jim Boeheim	Head Coach	1976–2023	2005
Carmelo Anthony	Forward	2002–03	2025

==== The Mannie Jackson - Basketball's Human Spirit Award ====
The award is given annually to an individual who has found the game of basketball to be a contributing aspect to their personal growth and accomplishment, a place to develop an understanding of others, and an avenue that helped shape that individual's growth into a recognized visionary and leader.

Recipients
Name	Year
Jim Boeheim	2010
Carmelo Anthony	2019

==== The Curt Gowdy Media Award ====
The Basketball Hall of Fame's media award was established by the board of trustees to single out members of the electronic and print media for outstanding contributions to basketball.

Recipients
Name	Year
Marty Glickman	1991
Marv Albert	1997
Bob Costas	1999

=== The NBA 75th Anniversary Team ===
The NBA 75th Anniversary Team, also referred to as the NBA 75, was chosen in 2021 to honor the 75th anniversary of the founding of the National Basketball Association (NBA). It was the fourth and most recent anniversary team in the league. Similar to the 50 Greatest Players in NBA History in 1996, a panel of media members, current and former players, coaches, general managers, and team executives selected the greatest players in league history.

Honorees
Name	Position	Years
Dave Bing	PG	1963–1966
Carmelo Anthony	F	2002-2003

=== Orange in the Olympics ===
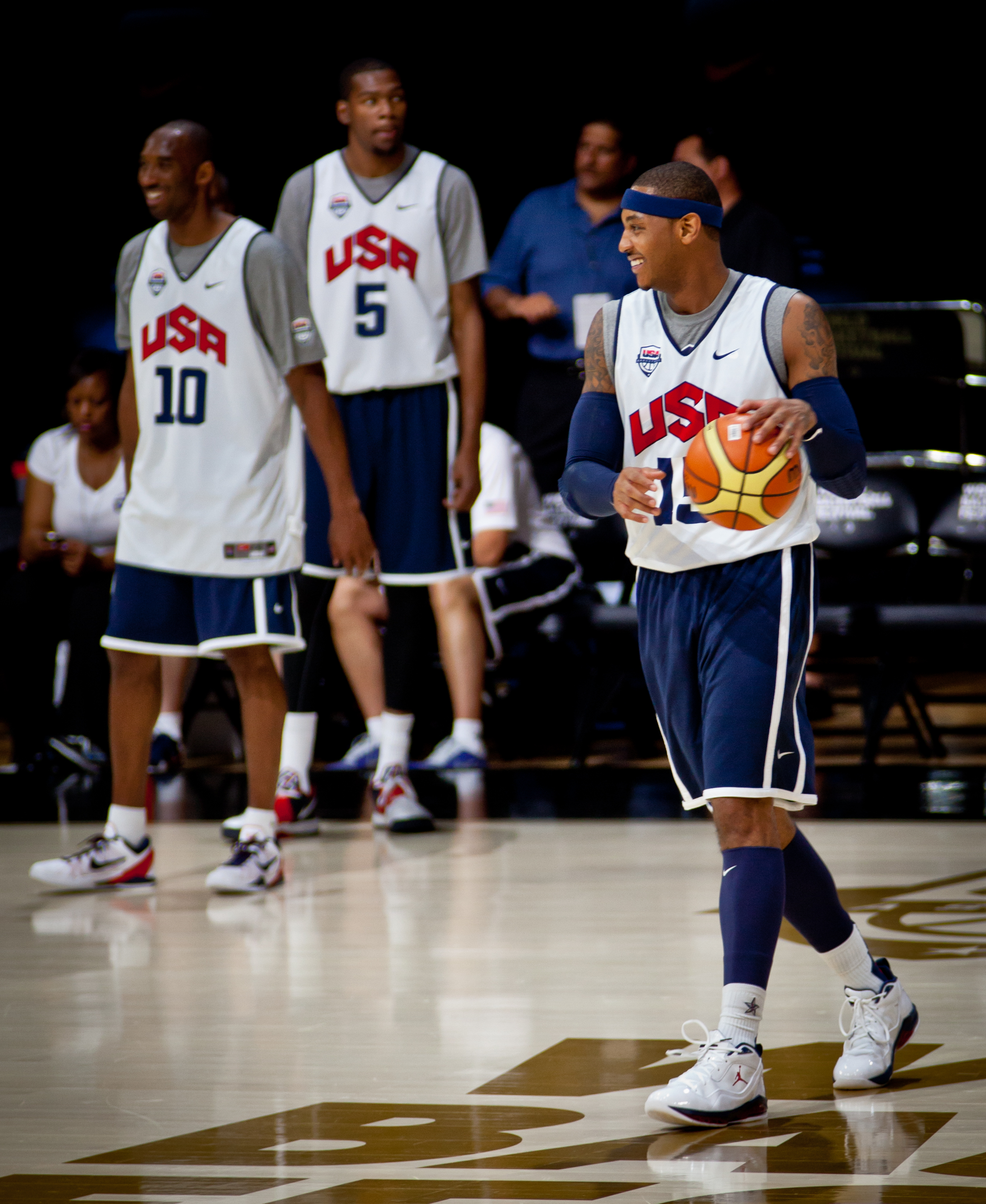
Carmelo Anthony with Team USA in the Olympics

Name	Year	City	Position	Country	Medal
Carmelo Anthony	2004	Athens	Forward	United States	Bronze medal
Carmelo Anthony	2008	Beijing	Forward	United States	Gold medal
Jim Boeheim	2008	Beijing	Asst. Coach	United States	Gold medal
Carmelo Anthony	2012	London	Forward	United States	Gold medal
Jim Boeheim	2012	London	Asst. Coach	United States	Gold medal
Carmelo Anthony	2016	Rio de Janeiro	Forward	United States	Gold medal
Jim Boeheim	2016	Rio de Janeiro	Asst. Coach	United States	Gold medal
Michael Gbinije	2016	Rio de Janeiro	Guard	Nigeria	
Jerami Grant	2020	Tokyo	Forward	United States	Gold medal

=== National coaching awards ===
Naismith College Coach of the Year Most outstanding head coach
2010	Jim Boeheim
AP College Basketball Coach of the Year Best head coach
2010	Jim Boeheim
Henry Iba Award Best head coach
2010	Jim Boeheim

NABC Coach of the Year Best head coach
2010	Jim Boeheim
John R. Wooden Award Legend of coaching
2006	Jim Boeheim
Basketball Times Coach of the Year Best head coach
2010	Jim Boeheim

Clair Bee Coach of the Year Significant contributions to the sport during the preceding year
2000	Jim Boeheim
USA Basketball National Coach of the Year Significant impact on the success of individual athlete and team performance
2001	Jim Boeheim

USA Basketball Developmental Coach of the Year Significant impact on the success of individual athlete and team performance
1998	Jim Boeheim

=== National award winners ===
Helms College Player of the Year Best player
1927	Vic Hanson
Basketball Times Player of the Year Best player
1990	Derrick Coleman

NCAA Tournament Most Outstanding Player Best player of NCAA Tournament
2003	Carmelo Anthony
USBWA National Freshman of the Year Best freshman player
2003	Carmelo Anthony

Chip Hilton Player of the Year Strong personal character on and off the court
2006	Gerry McNamara

USA Basketball Athlete of the Year Top performer
2006	Carmelo Anthony
2008	Carmelo Anthony
2016	Carmelo Anthony

=== College Basketball All-America selections ===
Syracuse basketball players have earned All-America honors over 70 times. Below are the consensus All-American recognitions, 12 of which are Consensus First-Team All-Americans.

All-America team selections

Year	Name	Pos.
1912	Lew Castle*	C
1914	Lew Castle*	C
1918	Joe Schwarzer*	C
1915	Leon Bob Marcus*	G
1925	Vic Hanson*	F
1926	Vic Hanson*	F
1927	Vic Hanson*	F
1946	Billy Gabor	G
1965	Dave Bing	G
1965	Dave Bing*	G
1974	Dennis DuVal	G
1975	Rudy Hackett	F

Year	Name	Pos.
1980	Roosevelt Bouie	C
1985	Pearl Washington	G
1986	Pearl Washington	G
1988	Sherman Douglas	G
1988	Rony Seikaly	C
1988	Sherman Douglas	G
1989	Derrick Coleman	C
1990	Derrick Coleman*	C
1990	Billy Owens	F
1991	Billy Owens*	F
1995	Lawrence Moten	F
1996	John Wallace	F

Year	Name	Pos.
2003	Carmelo Anthony	F
2004	Hakim Warrick	F
2005	Hakim Warrick*	F
2010	Wesley Johnson*	F
2014	C.J. Fair	F
2015	Rakeem Christmas	C

* – denotes Consensus First-Team All-Americans

=== NCAA Tournament awards ===
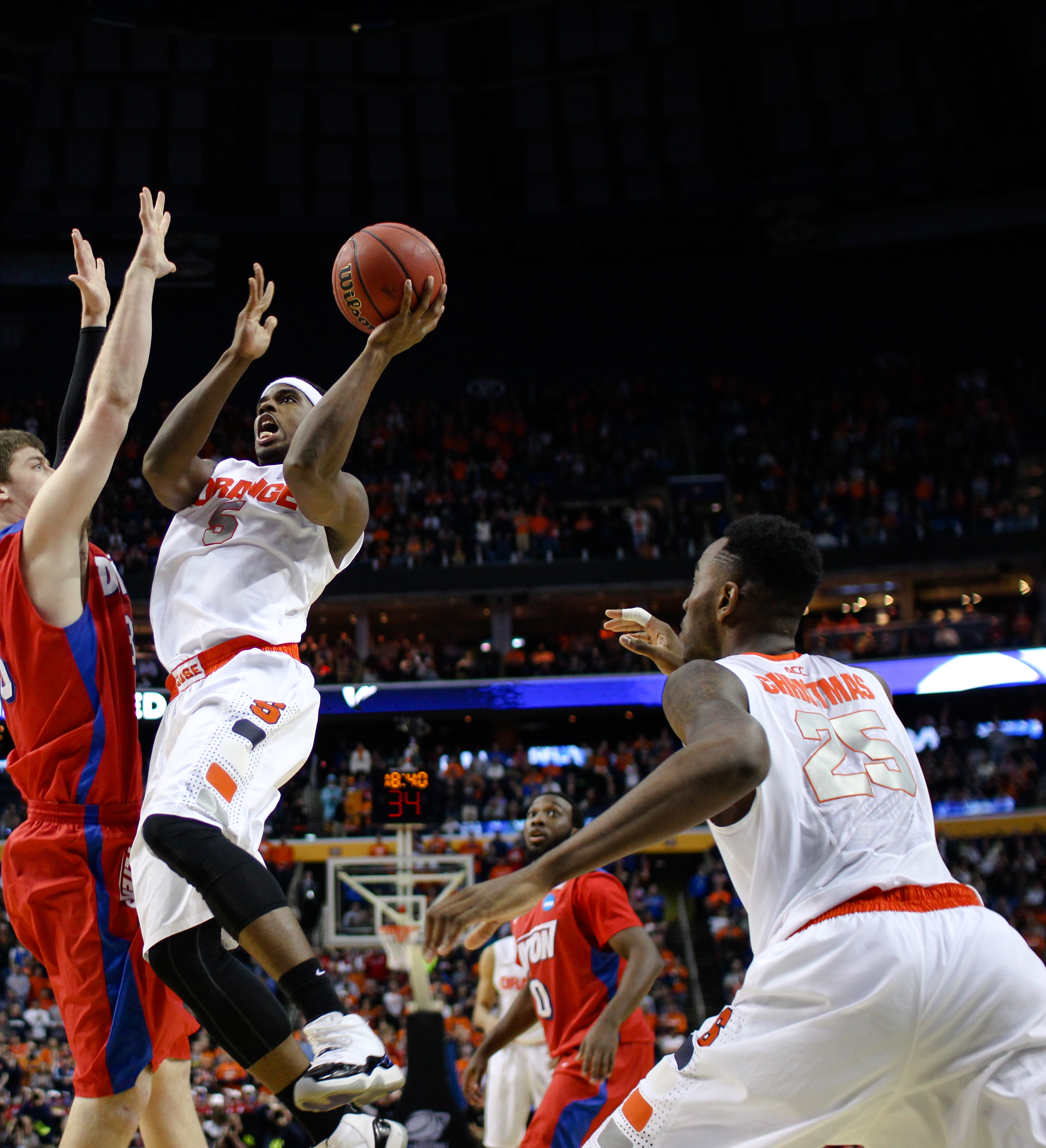
C.J. Fair and Rakeem Christmas, 2014 NCAA Tournament

NCAA basketball tournament Most Outstanding Player
Name	Pos.	Year
Carmelo Anthony	F	2003

NCAA Regional Most Outstanding Player
Name	Pos.	Year
Rony Seikaly	C	1987
John Wallace	F	1996
Carmelo Anthony	F	2003
Michael Carter-Williams	G	2013
Malachi Richardson	G	2016

NCAA All-Tournament Team
Name	Pos.	Year
Jim Lee	G	1975
Derrick Coleman	C	1987
Sherman Douglas	G	1987
John Wallace	G	1996
Todd Burgan	F	1996
Carmelo Anthony	F	2003
Gerry McNamara	G	2003

=== Big East Conference awards ===
Player of the Year
1990	Derrick Coleman
1991	Billy Owens
2005	Hakim Warrick
2010	Wesley Johnson
Coach of the Year
1984	Jim Boeheim
1991	Jim Boeheim
2000	Jim Boeheim
2010	Jim Boeheim

Defensive Player of the Year
1999	Etan Thomas
2000	Etan Thomas
2011	Rick Jackson
2012	Fab Melo
Freshman of the Year
1984	Pearl Washington
1987	Derrick Coleman
1992	Lawrence Moten
2003	Carmelo Anthony
2008	Jonny Flynn

Most Improved Player
1998	Etan Thomas
2001	Preston Shumpert
2003	Hakim Warrick
2013	Michael Carter-Williams
Sixth Man Award
2010	Kris Joseph
2012	Dion Waiters

Sportsmanship of the Year
2003	Kueth Duany
2005	Josh Pace
Scholar-Athlete Award
1990	Stephen Thompson
2005	Craig Forth

=== Atlantic Coast Conference awards ===
Most Improved Player of the Year
2015	Rakeem Christmas
Defensive Player of the Year
2015	Rakeem Christmas †

† co-winner

=== ACC All-Conference selections ===
Syracuse basketball players in All-ACC teams since 2013–14 season.

All-ACC team selections

Year	Name	Pos.
2014	Tyler Ennis	G
2014	C.J. Fair*	F
2015	Rakeem Christmas*	C
2016	Michael Gbinije	G
2017	Andrew White III	F
2018	Tyus Battle	G
2019	Tyus Battle	G
2020	Elijah Hughes*	F
2021	Quincy Guerrier	F
2022	Buddy Boeheim*	G
2023	Jesse Edwards	C
2024	Judah Mintz	G

* – denotes First-Team All-ACC

=== ACC All-Defensive Team selections ===
Syracuse basketball players in ACC All-Defensive teams since 2013–14 season.

ACC All-Defensive team players

Year	Name	Pos.
2014	Tyler Ennis	G
2015	Rakeem Christmas*	C
2016	Michael Gbinije	G
2023	Jesse Edwards	C
2024	Maliq Brown	F

* – Defensive Player of the Year

=== ACC All-Tournament Team selections ===
Syracuse basketball players in ACC All-Tournament teams since 2013–14 season.

ACC All-Tournament Team

Year	Name	Pos.
2019	Frank Howard	G
2021	Buddy Boeheim*	G
2022	Jimmy Boeheim	F

* – denotes First-Team

== Year-by-year results ==
Since playing its first official season in 1898–99, Syracuse ranks fifth in total victories among all NCAA Division I programs and seventh in all-time win percentage among programs with at least 50 years in Division I, with an all-time win–loss record of 2042–931(.687) as of March 30, 2021(vacated wins included).

Record table
Season	Coach	Overall	Conference	Standing	Postseason
No coach (1898–1903)
1898–99		1–0			
1900–01	No coach	2–2			
1901–02	No coach	3–3			
1902–03	No coach	1–8			
No coach:		7–13			
John A.R. Scott (Independent) (1903–1911)
1903–04	John A.R. Scott	11–8			
1904–05	John A.R. Scott	16–7			
1905–06	John A.R. Scott	9–3			
1906–07	John A.R. Scott	4–3			
1907–08	John A.R. Scott	10–3			
1908–09	John A.R. Scott	7–8			
1909–10	John A.R. Scott	3–11			
1910–11	John A.R. Scott	6–11			
John Scott:		66–54			
Edmund Dollard (Independent) (1911–1924)
1911–12	Edmund Dollard	11–3			
1912–13	Edmund Dollard	8–3			
1913–14	Edmund Dollard	12–0			
1914–15	Edmund Dollard	10–1			
1915–16	Edmund Dollard	9–3			
1916–17	Edmund Dollard	13–3			
1917–18	Edmund Dollard	16–1			Helms Champions
1918–19	Edmund Dollard	13–3			
1919–20	Edmund Dollard	15–3			
1920–21	Edmund Dollard	12–9			
1921–22	Edmund Dollard	16–8			
1922–23	Edmund Dollard	8–12			
1923–24	Edmund Dollard	8–10			
Ed Dollard:		151–59			
Lew Andreas (Independent) (1924–1950)
1924–25	Lew Andreas	15–2			
1925–26	Lew Andreas	19–1			Helms Champions
1926–27	Lew Andreas	15–4			
1927–28	Lew Andreas	10–6			
1928–29	Lew Andreas	11–4			
1929–30	Lew Andreas	18–2			
1930–31	Lew Andreas	16–4			
1931–32	Lew Andreas	13–8			
1932–33	Lew Andreas	14–2			
1933–34	Lew Andreas	15–2			
1934–35	Lew Andreas	15–2			
1935–36	Lew Andreas	12–5			
1936–37	Lew Andreas	13–4			
1937–38	Lew Andreas	14–5			
1938–39	Lew Andreas	15–4			
1939–40	Lew Andreas	10–8			
1940–41	Lew Andreas	14–5			
1941–42	Lew Andreas	15–6			
1942–43	Lew Andreas	8–10			
1944–45	Lew Andreas	7–12			
1945–46	Lew Andreas	23–4			NIT
1946–47	Lew Andreas	19–6			NCAA District II
1947–48	Lew Andreas	11–13			
1948–49	Lew Andreas	18–7			
1949–50	Lew Andreas	18–9			NIT
Lew Andreas:		358–135			
Marc Guley (Independent) (1950–1962)
1950–51	Marc Guley	19–9			
1951–52	Marc Guley	14–6			
1952–53	Marcel Guley	7–11			
1953–54	Marc Guley	10–9			
1954–55	Marc Guley	10–11			
1955–56	Marc Guley	14–8			
1956–57	Marc Guley	18–7			NCAA Elite Eight
1957–58	Marc Guley	11–10			
1958–59	Marc Guley	14–9			
1959–60	Marc Guley	13–8			
1960–61	Marc Guley	4–19			
1961–62	Marc Guley	2–22			
Marc Guley:		136–129			
Fred Lewis (Independent) (1962–1968)
1962–63	Fred Lewis	8–13			
1963–64	Fred Lewis	17–8			NIT
1964–65	Fred Lewis	13–10			
1965–66	Fred Lewis	22–6			NCAA Elite Eight
1966–67	Fred Lewis	20–6			NIT
1967–68	Fred Lewis	11–14			
Fred Lewis:		91–57			
Roy Danforth (Independent) (1968–1976)
1968–69	Roy Danforth	9–16			
1969–70	Roy Danforth	12–12			
1970–71	Roy Danforth	19–7			NIT
1971–72	Roy Danforth	22–6			NIT
1972–73	Roy Danforth	24–5			NCAA Sweet Sixteen
1973–74	Roy Danforth	19–7			NCAA round of 32
1974–75^{†}	Roy Danforth	23–9			NCAA Final Four
1975–76^{†}	Roy Danforth	20–9			NCAA round of 32
Roy Danforth:		148–71			
Jim Boeheim (Independent) (1976–1979)
1976–77^{†}	Jim Boeheim	26–4			NCAA Sweet Sixteen
1977–78	Jim Boeheim	22–6			NCAA round of 32
1978–79	Jim Boeheim	26–4			NCAA Sweet Sixteen
Jim Boeheim:		74–14			
Jim Boeheim (Big East Conference) (1979–2013)
1979–80	Jim Boeheim	26–4	5–1	T-1st	NCAA Sweet Sixteen
1980–81	Jim Boeheim	22–12	6–8	6th	NIT
1981–82	Jim Boeheim	16–13	7–7	T-5th	NIT
1982–83	Jim Boeheim	21–10	9–7	5th	NCAA round of 32
1983–84	Jim Boeheim	23–9	12–4	T-2nd	NCAA Sweet Sixteen
1984–85	Jim Boeheim	22–9	9–7	T-3rd	NCAA round of 32
1985–86	Jim Boeheim	26–6	14–2	T-1st	NCAA round of 32
1986–87	Jim Boeheim	31–7	12–4	T-1st	NCAA Runner-up
1987–88	Jim Boeheim	26–9	11–5	2nd	NCAA round of 32
1988–89	Jim Boeheim	30–8	10–6	3rd	NCAA Elite Eight
1989–90	Jim Boeheim	26–7	12–4	T-1st	NCAA Sweet Sixteen
1990–91	Jim Boeheim	26–6	12–4	1st	NCAA round of 64
1991–92	Jim Boeheim	22–10	10–8	T-5th	NCAA round of 32
1992–93	Jim Boeheim	20–9	10–8	3rd	
1993–94	Jim Boeheim	23–7	13–5	2nd	NCAA Sweet Sixteen
1994–95	Jim Boeheim	20–10	12–6	3rd	NCAA round of 32
1995–96	Jim Boeheim	29–9	12–6	2nd (BE7)	NCAA Runner-up
1996–97	Jim Boeheim	19–13	9–9	4th (BE7)	NIT
1997–98	Jim Boeheim	26–9	12–6	1st (BE7)	NCAA Sweet Sixteen
1998–99	Jim Boeheim	21–12	10–8	4th	NCAA round of 64
1999–00	Jim Boeheim	26–6	13–3	T-1st (W)	NCAA Sweet Sixteen
2000–01	Jim Boeheim	25–9	10–6	T-2nd (W)	NCAA round of 32
2001–02	Jim Boeheim	23–13	9–7	T-3rd (W)	NIT
2002–03	Jim Boeheim	30–5	13–3	T-1st (W)	NCAA champion
2003–04	Jim Boeheim	23–8	11–5	T-3rd	NCAA Sweet Sixteen
2004–05*	Jim Boeheim	27–7	11–5	T-3rd	NCAA round of 64
2005–06*	Jim Boeheim	23–12	7–9	T-9th	NCAA round of 64
2006–07*	Jim Boeheim	24–11	10–6	T-5th	NIT
2007–08	Jim Boeheim	21–14	9–9	T-8th	NIT
2008–09	Jim Boeheim	28–10	11–7	6th	NCAA Sweet Sixteen
2009–10	Jim Boeheim	30–5	15–3	T-1st	NCAA Sweet Sixteen
2010–11*	Jim Boeheim	27–8	12–6	4th	NCAA round of 32
2011–12*	Jim Boeheim	34–3	17–1	1st	NCAA Elite Eight
2012–13	Jim Boeheim	30–10	11–7	5th	NCAA Final Four
Jim Boeheim:		846–300	366–192		
Jim Boeheim (Atlantic Coast Conference) (2013–2023)
2013–14	Jim Boeheim	28–6	14–4	2nd	NCAA round of 32
2014–15	Jim Boeheim	18–13	9–9	8th	
2015–16	Jim Boeheim	23–14	9–9	9th	NCAA Final Four
2016–17	Jim Boeheim	19–15	10–8	T-7th	NIT
2017–18	Jim Boeheim	23–14	8–10	T-10th	NCAA Sweet Sixteen
2018–19	Jim Boeheim	20–14	10–8	6th	NCAA round of 64
2019–20	Jim Boeheim	18–14	10–10	T-6th	No Postseason Played - COVID-19
2020–21	Jim Boeheim	18–10	9–7	8th	NCAA Sweet Sixteen
2021–22	Jim Boeheim	16–17	9–11	9th	Did not qualify
2022–23	Jim Boeheim	17–15	10–10	T–8th	Did not qualify
Jim Boeheim:		200–132	98–88		
Adrian Autry (Atlantic Coast Conference) (2023–present)
2023–24	Adrian Autry	20–12	11–9	T–5th	
2024–25	Adrian Autry	14–19	7–13	14th	Did not qualify
2025–26	Adrian Autry	15–17	6–12	14th	Did not qualify
Adrian Autry:		49–48	24–34		
Total:		2,022–1,013^{[Note H]}			
National champion Postseason invitational champion Conference regular season champion Conference regular season and conference tournament champion Division regular season champion Division regular season and conference tournament champion Conference tournament champion

* - Indicates season for which the school's overall and/or conference record has been later adjusted by penalty

^{†} - From 1975 to 1982, the Eastern College Athletic Conference (ECAC) organized annual regional end-of-season men's basketball tournaments for independent Division I ECAC member colleges and universities in the Northeastern United States. The winner of each regional tournament was declared the ECAC regional champion for the season and received an automatic bid in the NCAA Division I men's basketball tournament.

== Players currently in the NBA ==
- Jerami Grant, forward for the Portland Trail Blazers

== Players currently playing professionally around the world ==
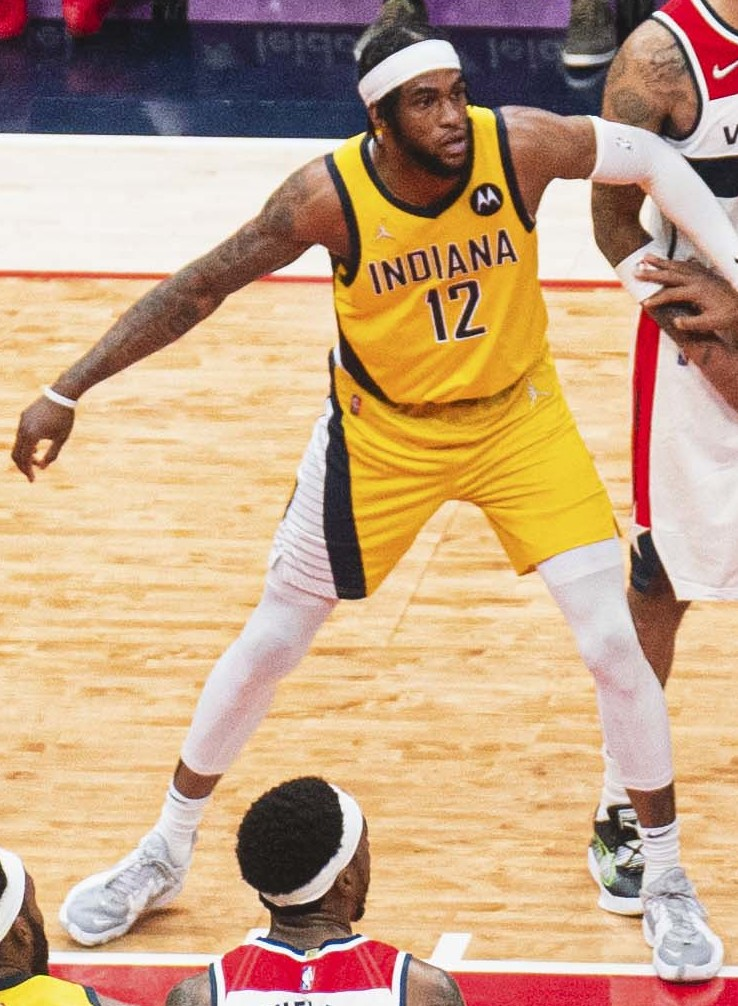
Oshae Brissett

- Oshae Brissett, shooting guard for Maccabi Tel Aviv
- Rakeem Christmas, forward
- Marek Dolezaj, forward for SAE Scientifica Legnano
- Tyler Ennis, point guard for Hapoel Tel Aviv
- C. J. Fair, forward for the Windy City Bulls
- Michael Gbinije, guard for the Cape Town Tigers
- Cole Swider, forward for Coachella Valley Lakers

== See also ==
- NCAA Division I men's basketball tournament records
- List of teams with the highest winning percentage in NCAA Division I men's college basketball
- List of teams with the most victories in NCAA Division I men's college basketball
- NCAA Men's Division I Final Four appearances by coaches
- NCAA Men's Division I Final Four appearances by school
- NCAA Division I men's basketball tournament all-time team records
- Basketball in the United States
- College basketball
