= Marc Guley =

American basketball player and coach (1912–1990)

Marcel Guley (May 5, 1912 – November 6, 1990) was an American college basketball player and coach who was head coach of the Syracuse Orange from 1950–1962.

== Biography ==
Guley was born in the Austro-Hungarian Empire on May 5, 1912. He had been an assistant to Lewis Andreas prior to his appointment as head coach. His teams compiled a record of 136 wins and 129 losses with a winning percentage of .513. Guley's tenure as Syracuse's coach was capped off by 1956–1957 team, which was Syracuse's first NCAA tournament appearance. The team went 18–7 on the year, and beat Connecticut and Lafayette before falling to eventual champion North Carolina 67–58 in the Regional Final. Guley left the Orange after the 1961–1962 season, where the team went 2–22. He was replaced by Fred Lewis.

Guley was a graduate of Syracuse University and played guard three seasons for the Orangemen, lettering twice, and was captain of the 1936 team. He also played baseball for Syracuse in 1936. While at Syracuse Guley became a member of the Sigma chapter of the Phi Kappa Tau fraternity.

After resigning from Syracuse, he coached Physical Education at Cazenovia Elementary Schools for 18 years, retiring in 1980.

Guley also played professional basketball for the Binghamton Triplets and Newark Elks, and coached high school basketball in Delhi, New York and Walton, New York. He was a communications officer in the Navy during World War II.

== Head coaching record ==
Year	Team	Overall	Notes	Home arena
1950–51	Syracuse	19–9		New York State Fair Coliseum
1951–52	Syracuse	14–6		Onondaga County War Memorial
1952–53	Syracuse	7–11		Archbold Gymnasium
1953–54	Syracuse	10–9		Archbold Gymnasium
1954–55	Syracuse	10–11		Archbold Gymnasium
1955–56	Syracuse	14–8		Onondaga County War Memorial
1956–57	Syracuse	18–7	First Ever NCAA tournament Berth	Onondaga County War Memorial
1957–58	Syracuse	11–10		Onondaga County War Memorial
1958–59	Syracuse	14–9		Onondaga County War Memorial
1959–60	Syracuse	13–8		Onondaga County War Memorial
1960–61	Syracuse	4–19		Onondaga County War Memorial
1961–62	Syracuse	2–22		Onondaga County War Memorial
Total	136–129			
