= List of teams with the highest winning percentage in NCAA Division I men's college basketball =

This is a list of Men's Division I college basketball teams ranked by winning percentage through the end of the 2025–26 season. It includes only those schools that have spent at least 25 years in Division I.

Rank	College	First season	Seasons	Wins	Losses	Ties	Win%
1	Kentucky	1903	122	2,422	770	1	.759
2	North Carolina	1911	115	2,395	874	0	.733
3	Kansas	1899	127	2,414	909	0	.726
4	Duke	1906	120	2,335	933	0	.715
5	UCLA	1920	106	2,025	916	0	.689
6	UNLV	1959	67	1,367	642	0	.680
7	Syracuse	1901	124	2,007	995	0	.669
8	Arizona	1905	120	1,913	999	1	.657
9	VCU	1971	55	1,102	576	0	.657
10	Western Kentucky	1915	106	1,911	1,000	0	.656
11	Villanova	1921	105	1,903	1,004	0	.655
12	Norfolk State	1954	72	1,350	740	0	.646
13	UConn	1901	122	1,861	1,026	0	.645
14	Murray State	1926	100	1,752	971	0	.643
15	Illinois	1906	120	1,929	1,074	0	.642
16	St John's	1908	118	1,973	1,103	0	.641
17	Purdue	1897	127	1,953	1,092	0	.641
18	Louisville	1912	111	1,811	1,019	0	.640
19	Arkansas	1924	102	1,821	1,028	0	.639
20	Cincinnati	1902	124	1,930	1,095	0	.638
21	Notre Dame	1898	122	1,978	1,127	2	.637
22	Memphis	1921	102	1,699	971	1	.636
23	Lipscomb	1937	75	1,343	772	0	.635
24	Utah	1909	117	1,914	1,101	0	.635
25	Indiana	1901	125	1,950	1,130	0	.633
26	Temple	1895	129	2,010	1,172	0	.632
27	UAB	1979	47	960	561	0	.631
28	Weber State	1963	63	1,162	699	0	.624
29	Texas	1906	119	1,919	1,155	0	.624
30	BYU	1903	123	1,918	1,155	0	.624
31	Houston	1946	80	1,468	886	0	.624
32	Marquette	1917	108	1,763	1,073	0	.622
33	Alabama	1913	112	1,820	1,108	1	.622
34	Missouri State	1909	113	1,769	1,080	0	.621
35	Gonzaga	1908	117	1,842	1,128	0	.620
36	Princeton	1901	124	1,850	1,135	0	.620
37	Tennessee	1909	116	1,802	1,111	2	.619
38	Akron	1901	124	1,745	1,086	0	.616
39	Michigan State	1899	126	1,861	1,163	0	.615
40	NC State	1913	113	1,828	1,155	0	.613
41	West Virginia	1904	116	1,874	1,188	0	.612
42	Creighton	1912	108	1,735	1,110	0	.610
43	Penn	1897	124	1,854	1,189	2	.609
44	Ohio State	1899	124	1,807	1,163	0	.608
45	Oklahoma	1908	118	1,796	1,163	0	.607
46	Dayton	1904	120	1,782	1,172	0	.603
47	Stephen F. Austin	1925	99	1,496	990	0	.602
48	Old Dominion	1951	75	1,268	841	0	.601
49	Utah State	1904	119	1,740	1,164	0	.599
50	Xavier	1920	104	1,610	1,079	0	.599

Note: Records are adjusted with vacated and forfeited games not included like they are in the NCAA record book.

== See also ==
- College basketball
- List of teams with the most victories in NCAA Division I men's college basketball
- NCAA Division I men's basketball tournament records

== Sources ==
- NCAA Division I Men's Basketball Official Recordbook (most successful teams through 2019-2020 season by all-time wins and all time winning percentage are listed on page 75)
