= List of teams with the most victories in NCAA Division I men's college basketball =

This is a list of top NCAA Division I Men's basketball teams ranked by the number of wins through the end of the last completed season, 2025–26.

Rank	College	First Season	Seasons	Wins	Losses	Ties	Win%
1	Kentucky	1902	123	2,444	784	0	.757
2	Kansas	1898	128	2,438	920	1	.726
3	North Carolina	1910	116	2,419	883	0	.733
4	Duke	1905	121	2,370	936	0	.717
5	UCLA	1919	107	2,049	928	0	.688
6	Temple	1894	130	2,026	1,188	0	.630
7	Syracuse	1900	125	2,022	1,034	0	.662
8	St. John's	1908	119	2,003	1,110	0	.643
9	Notre Dame	1896	122	1,991	1,145	1	.635
10	Purdue	1897	128	1,983	1,101	0	.643
11	Indiana	1901	126	1,968	1,144	0	.632
12	Illinois	1906	121	1,957	1,083	0	.644
13	Arizona	1905	120	1,949	1,002	1	.660
14	Cincinnati	1902	125	1,948	1,110	0	.637
15	BYU	1903	124	1,941	1,167	0	.625
16	Texas	1906	120	1,940	1,170	0	.624
17	Western Kentucky	1915	107	1,929	1,014	0	.655
18	Villanova	1921	106	1,927	1,013	0	.655
19	Utah	1909	118	1,924	1,123	0	.631
20	UConn	1901	123	1,895	1,032	0	.647
21	West Virginia	1904	117	1,895	1,202	0	.612
22	Washington	1896	124	1,891	1,303	0	.592
23	Michigan State	1899	127	1,888	1,171	0	.617
24	Gonzaga	1908	118	1,873	1,132	0	.623
25	Penn	1897	125	1,872	1,201	2	.609
26	Princeton	1901	125	1,859	1,155	0	.617
27	Arkansas	1924	103	1,849	1,037	0	.641
28	NC State	1913	114	1,848	1,169	0	.613
29	Oregon State	1902	125	1,847	1,473	0	.556
30	Alabama	1913	113	1,845	1,118	1	.623
31	Louisville	1912	112	1,835	1,030	0	.640
32	Ohio State	1899	125	1,828	1,176	0	.609
33	Tennessee	1909	117	1,827	1,123	2	.619
34	Bradley	1903	122	1,818	1,287	0	.586
35	Oklahoma	1908	119	1,817	1,179	0	.606
36	Oregon	1903	121	1,816	1,448	0	.556
37	Dayton	1904	121	1,807	1,184	0	.604
38	Iowa	1902	125	1,799	1,246	0	.591
39	Virginia	1906	121	1,787	1,238	1	.591
40	Missouri State	1909	114	1,785	1,098	0	.619
41	Oklahoma State	1908	117	1,785	1,282	0	.582
42	Marquette	1917	109	1,775	1,093	0	.619
43	Akron	1904	120	1,774	1,095	0	.618
44	Murray State	1926	101	1,772	984	0	.643
45	Utah State	1898	128	1,769	1,171	0	.602
46	Kansas State	1903	122	1,768	1,275	0	.581
47	Georgetown	1907	118	1,756	1,190	0	.596
48	Wisconsin	1899	128	1,756	1,310	0	.573
49	Creighton	1912	109	1,751	1,128	0	.608
50	USC	1907	120	1,748	1,293	2	.575

== See also ==
- List of teams with the highest winning percentage in NCAA Division I men's college basketball
- List of teams with the most victories in NCAA Division I women's college basketball
- List of vacated and forfeited games in college basketball
- NCAA Division I men's basketball tournament records
