= Lew Andreas =

American football player, coach, and administrator (1895–1983)

Biographical details
- Born: February 25, 1895; Sterling, Illinois, U.S.
- Died: June 16, 1983 (aged 88); Syracuse, New York, U.S.

Playing career

Football
- 1919–1920: Syracuse
- 1921: Syracuse Pros

Baseball
- c. 1920: Syracuse
- Positions: End (football); Catcher (baseball)

Coaching career (HC unless noted)

Football
- 1927–1929: Syracuse

Basketball
- 1924–1950: Syracuse

Administrative career (AD unless noted)
- 1937–1964: Syracuse

Head coaching record
- Overall: 15–10–3 (football); 358–134 (basketball)

Lewis P. Andreas (February 25, 1895 – June 16, 1983) was an American football and basketball coach and college athletics administrator. He was the head coach for Syracuse University's men's basketball and football programs beginning in the 1920s. The Sterling, Illinois native played baseball, basketball and football at University of Illinois as a freshman before transferring to Syracuse. He then played football and baseball, but not basketball, for the Orangemen (now Orange) before embarking on his coaching career.

Andreas coached the Orangemen basketball team from 1924 to 1950, except one year World War II when the team was suspended due to travel restrictions. He guided the Orangemen basketball program to a 358–134 (.726) overall record in 24 years. Led by standout Vic Hanson, his 1925–26 team finished the season with a 19–1 record and was retroactively named the national champion by the Helms Athletic Foundation. Later on, the team was also retroactively listed as the top team of the season by the Premo-Porretta Power Poll. In football, Andreas compiled a 15–10–3 overall record between 1927 and 1929. His winning percentage is the highest in program history and 358 career victories are second, only behind Jim Boeheim. At the university he was also the Director of Physical Education and Athletics from 1937 until retirement in 1964. In 1950 he was replaced by assistant coach Marc Guley.

Off the court, he served on the NCAA Basketball Committee on two separate occasions, 1943–44 and 1954–58. He was also president of the National Association of Basketball Coaches. In 1948, he was inducted into the Helms Collegiate Hall of Fame in 1948. He also 'had a cup of coffee' in the professional leagues as a player for the Syracuse Pros. He died in 1983 and is buried in Oakwood Cemetery.

Andreas was inducted into the Syracuse Sports Hall of Fame in 1988.

== Head coaching record ==
=== Football ===
Year	Team	Overall	Conference	Standing	Bowl/playoffs
Syracuse Orangemen (Independent) (1927–1929)
1927	Syracuse	5–3–2			
1928	Syracuse	4–4–1			
1929	Syracuse	6–3			
Syracuse:		15–10–3			
Total:		15–10–3			

=== Basketball ===
Year	Team	Overall	Notes	Home arena
Syracuse Orangeman (1924–1950)
1924–25	Syracuse	15–2		Archbold Gymnasium
1925–26	Syracuse	19–1	Helms Foundation National Champions	Archbold Gymnasium
1926–27	Syracuse	15–4		Archbold Gymnasium
1927–28	Syracuse	10–6		Archbold Gymnasium
1928–29	Syracuse	11–4		Archbold Gymnasium
1929–30	Syracuse	18–2		Archbold Gymnasium
1930–31	Syracuse	16–4		Archbold Gymnasium
1931–32	Syracuse	13–8		Archbold Gymnasium
1932–33	Syracuse	14–2		Archbold Gymnasium
1933–34	Syracuse	15–2		Archbold Gymnasium
1934–35	Syracuse	15–2		Archbold Gymnasium
1935–36	Syracuse	12–5		Archbold Gymnasium
1936–37	Syracuse	13–4		Archbold Gymnasium
1937–38	Syracuse	14–5		Archbold Gymnasium
1938–39	Syracuse	15–4		Archbold Gymnasium
1939–40	Syracuse	10–8		Archbold Gymnasium
1940–41	Syracuse	14–5		Archbold Gymnasium
1941–42	Syracuse	14–6		Archbold Gymnasium
1942–43	Syracuse	8–10		Archbold Gymnasium
1943–44	Syracuse		Basketball Suspended due to WWII	Archbold Gymnasium
1944–45	Syracuse	7–12		Archbold Gymnasium
1945–46	Syracuse	23–4	Loss to Muhlenberg in NIT	Archbold Gymnasium
1946–47	Syracuse	19–6		Archbold Gymnasium
1947–48	Syracuse	11–13		Archbold Gymnasium
1948–49	Syracuse	18–7		Archbold Gymnasium
1949–50	Syracuse	18–9	Loss to Bradley in NIT second round	Archbold Gymnasium
Career	358–134 (.726)			Archbold Gymnasium
