= Edmund Dollard =

American basketball coach

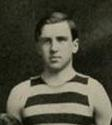
Dollard as Syracuse Orangemen basketball player (c. 1904.)

Edmund "Eddie" Dollard (February 12, 1885 – June 1964) was an American basketball coach. He was the head basketball coach at Syracuse University from 1911 to 1924. His teams compiled a record of 151 wins along with 59 losses, and an overall winning percentage of .719. Dollard guided Syracuse to 11 consecutive winning seasons, along with an unblemished 12–0 mark during the 1913–14 season. His 1917–18 team finished the season with a 16–1 record and was retroactively named the national champion by the Helms Athletic Foundation. In addition, this team was retroactively listed as the top team of the season by the Premo-Porretta Power Poll. Dollard left Syracuse after an unsuccessful 1923–24 campaign where the team went 8–10.
