= John A. R. Scott =

American basketball coach

Head coaching record
- Overall: 64–54 (.542)

John A. R. Scott was the first head coach of Syracuse University's men's basketball team. He coached from 1903 to 1911, and his teams compiled a record of 64 wins and 54 losses, a winning percentage of .542 (SU Media Guide). Scott's tenure at Syracuse was highlighted by the 1905–1906 and 1907–1908 seasons, where his teams went 9-3 and 10-3 respectively (SU Media Guide). Scott left the program after the 1910–1911 season, where his team went 6-11.
