= 1904–05 collegiate men's basketball season in the United States =

American college basketball season

- Helms National Champions: Columbia (retroactive selection in 1943)
- Player of the Year (Helms): Christian Steinmetz, Wisconsin (retroactive selection in 1944)

The 1904–05 collegiate men's basketball season in the United States began in December 1904, progressed through the regular season, and concluded in March 1905.

== Season headlines ==
- Referring to the "college championship" competition on the basketball program of the 1904 Olympic Games — which Hiram College had won, prompting it to claim the mythical collegiate national basketball championship for the 1903–04 season — Spalding's Official Basket Ball Guide for 1904, published in September 1904, offers the opinion that "This tournament marks the beginning of what may in the years to come be an annual fixture, namely — a National College Basket Ball Championship held annually between the colleges of the U.S. played in alternate years in the East and West. Such a championship could easily be made a great athletic and social event."
- Christian Steinmetz of Wisconsin became the first player to score at least 1,000 points during his career.
- Columbia (19–1) claimed to be the collegiate national champion of the 1904–05 season because it had two wins over traveling Western Conference teams — Wisconsin and Minnesota — during the season and because of its combined record over the 1903–04 season (when it had finished 17–1) and 1904–05 season.
- In February 1943, the Helms Athletic Foundation retroactively selected Columbia as its national champion for the 1904–05 season.
- In 1995, the Premo-Porretta Power Poll retroactively selected Columbia as its top-ranked team for the 1904–05 season.

== Conference membership changes ==
School	Former Conference	New Conference
Harvard Crimson	Eastern Intercollegiate Basketball League	Independent
Northwestern Wildcats	No major basketball program	Western Conference

== Regular season ==
=== Conference winners ===
Conference	Regular Season Winner	Conference Player of the Year	Conference Tournament	Tournament Venue (City)	Tournament Winner
Eastern Intercollegiate Basketball League	Columbia	None selected	No Tournament		
Western Conference	None (see note)	None selected	No Tournament		

NOTE: The Western Conference (the future Big Ten Conference) did not sponsor an official conference season or recognize a regular-season champion until the 1905–06 season, although intramural games took place between conference members during the 1904–05 season. In 1904–05, Chicago (9–3) finished with the best winning percentage (.750) and Wisconsin (10–8) with the most wins.

1904–05 Eastern Intercollegiate Basketball League standings
	Conf.				Overall
Team	W		L	PCT	W		L	PCT
Columbia	8	–	0	1.000	19	–	1	.950
Yale	5	–	3	.625	22	–	13	.629
Princeton	4	–	4	.500	8	–	5	.615
Cornell	2	–	6	.250	5	–	16	.238
Penn	1	–	7	.125	9	–	14	.391

1904–05 Western Conference men's basketball standings
	Conf.				Overall
Team	W		L	PCT	W		L	PCT
Chicago†	5	–	2	.714	9	–	3	.750
Wisconsin	1	–	0	1.000	10	–	8	.556
Minnesota	3	–	1	.750	7	–	7	.500
Northwestern	1	–	2	.333	2	–	2	.500
Iowa	0	–	3	.000	6	–	8	.429
Purdue	1	–	3	.250	3	–	6	.333
Indiana	1	–	1	.500	5	–	12	.294
† Intramural play only, the conference did not have an official champion winner

=== Independents ===
A total of 64 college teams played as major independents. Among them, Williams (20–2) and Lewis (20–5) finished with the most wins.

1904–05 collegiate men's basketball independents standings
	Conf.				Overall
Team	W		L	PCT	W		L	PCT
Arizona		–		–	1	–	0	1.000
Augustana (Ill.)		–		–	9	–	0	1.000
Denver		–		–	1	–	0	1.000
Muskingum		–		–	8	–	0	1.000
New Mexico		–		–	1	–	0	1.000
Wabash		–		–	8	–	0	1.000
Washington University		–		–	1	–	0	1.000
Wyoming		–		–	1	–	0	1.000
Williams		–		–	20	–	2	.909
Bucknell		–		–	8	–	1	.889
Dayton		–		–	6	–	1	.857
Ohio State		–		–	12	–	2	.857
Allegheny		–		–	10	–	2	.833
Lewis		–		–	20	–	5	.800
Grove City		–		–	15	–	4	.789
North Dakota		–		–	7	–	2	.778
Wheaton (Ill.)		–		–	10	–	3	.769
Brigham Young		–		–	9	–	3	.750
Butler		–		–	6	–	2	.750
Fordham		–		–	18	–	6	.750
Penn State		–		–	6	–	2	.750
Montana State		–		–	5	–	2	.714
Harvard		–		–	11	–	5	.688
Nebraska		–		–	11	–	5	.688
Brown		–		–	13	–	6	.684
Cincinnati		–		–	6	–	3	.667
Dartmouth		–		–	20	–	10	.667
North Dakota Agricultural		–		–	6	–	3	.667
Syracuse		–		–	14	–	7	.667
Denison		–		–	9	–	5	.643
Canisius		–		–	7	–	4	.636
Oberlin		–		–	7	–	4	.636
Michigan State		–		–	5	–	3	.625
Oregon Agricultural		–		–	5	–	3	.625
Southwestern (Kan.)		–		–	5	–	3	.625
Colorado		–		–	3	–	2	.600
Holy Cross		–		–	6	–	4	.600
Washington State		–		–	3	–	2	.600
Colgate		–		–	10	–	7	.588
Akron		–		–	8	–	6	.571
Bradley		–		–	5	–	4	.556
Westminster (Pa.)		–		–	6	–	5	.545
Bloomsburg		–		–	3	–	3	.500
Colorado Architectural		–		–	2	–	2	.500
Connecticut		–		–	3	–	3	.500
Illinois State		–		–	4	–	4	.500
Indiana State		–		–	5	–	5	.500
Manhattan		–		–	3	–	3	.500
Wisconsin–Stevens Point		–		–	3	–	3	.500
Kansas		–		–	5	–	6	.455
Lehigh		–		–	4	–	5	.444
Maine		–		–	7	–	9	.438
Army		–		–	3	–	4	.429
Mount Union		–		–	6	–	8	.429
West Virginia		–		–	6	–	9	.400
Temple		–		–	3	–	5	.375
Baker		–		–	5	–	10	.333
Gettysburg		–		–	3	–	6	.333
Wooster		–		–	3	–	8	.273
Kentucky		–		–	1	–	4	.200
Lake Forest		–		–	0	–	5	.000
New Mexico A&M		–		–	0	–	1	.000
Washington		–		–	0	–	2	.000
Wesleyan (Conn.)		–		–	0	–	12	.000

== Awards ==
=== Helms College Basketball All-Americans ===
The practice of selecting a Consensus All-American Team did not begin until the 1928–29 season. The Helms Athletic Foundation later retroactively selected a list of All-Americans for the 1904–05 season.

Player	Team
Harry A. Fisher	Columbia
Marcus Hurley	Columbia
Willard Hyatt	Yale
Gilmore Kinney	Yale
C. D. McLees	Wisconsin
James Ozanne	Chicago
Walter Runge	Colgate
Chris Steinmetz	Wisconsin
George Tuck	Minnesota
Oliver deGray Vanderbilt	Princeton

=== Major player of the year awards ===
- Helms Player of the Year: Christian Steinmetz, Wisconsin (retroactive selection in 1944)

== Coaching changes ==
A number of teams changed coaches during the season and after it ended.

Team	Former Coach	Interim Coach	New Coach	Reason
Brown	Paul DeWolf		Oscar Rackle	
Canisius	J. P. Quinslisk		John Schmitt	
Fordham	Harry A. Fisher		Loren Black	
Iowa	John Chalmers		Ed Rule	
Maine	George Huntington		George Owen	
Purdue	James Nufer		Clarence B. Jamison	
Temple	Harry Wingert		John Crescenzo	
Washington Agricultural	James N. Ashmore		Everett Sweeley	
