= 1904–05 Drexel Blue and Gold men's basketball team =

American college basketball season

1904–05 Drexel Blue and Gold men's basketball
- Conference: Independent (collegiate), Philadelphia Interscholastic League
- Record: – (6–8 PIL)
- Head coach: No coach
- Captain: Beatty
- Home arena: Main Building

1904–05 collegiate men's basketball independents standings
	Conf.				Overall
Team	W		L	PCT	W		L	PCT
Arizona		–		–	1	–	0	1.000
Augustana (Ill.)		–		–	9	–	0	1.000
Denver		–		–	1	–	0	1.000
Muskingum		–		–	8	–	0	1.000
New Mexico		–		–	1	–	0	1.000
Wabash		–		–	8	–	0	1.000
Washington University		–		–	1	–	0	1.000
Wyoming		–		–	1	–	0	1.000
Williams		–		–	20	–	2	.909
Bucknell		–		–	8	–	1	.889
Dayton		–		–	6	–	1	.857
Ohio State		–		–	12	–	2	.857
Allegheny		–		–	10	–	2	.833
Lewis		–		–	20	–	5	.800
Grove City		–		–	15	–	4	.789
North Dakota		–		–	7	–	2	.778
Wheaton (Ill.)		–		–	10	–	3	.769
Brigham Young		–		–	9	–	3	.750
Butler		–		–	6	–	2	.750
Fordham		–		–	18	–	6	.750
Penn State		–		–	6	–	2	.750
Montana State		–		–	5	–	2	.714
Harvard		–		–	11	–	5	.688
Nebraska		–		–	11	–	5	.688
Brown		–		–	13	–	6	.684
Cincinnati		–		–	6	–	3	.667
Dartmouth		–		–	20	–	10	.667
North Dakota Agricultural		–		–	6	–	3	.667
Syracuse		–		–	14	–	7	.667
Denison		–		–	9	–	5	.643
Canisius		–		–	7	–	4	.636
Oberlin		–		–	7	–	4	.636
Michigan State		–		–	5	–	3	.625
Oregon Agricultural		–		–	5	–	3	.625
Southwestern (Kan.)		–		–	5	–	3	.625
Colorado		–		–	3	–	2	.600
Holy Cross		–		–	6	–	4	.600
Washington State		–		–	3	–	2	.600
Colgate		–		–	10	–	7	.588
Akron		–		–	8	–	6	.571
Bradley		–		–	5	–	4	.556
Westminster (Pa.)		–		–	6	–	5	.545
Bloomsburg		–		–	3	–	3	.500
Colorado Architectural		–		–	2	–	2	.500
Connecticut		–		–	3	–	3	.500
Illinois State		–		–	4	–	4	.500
Indiana State		–		–	5	–	5	.500
Manhattan		–		–	3	–	3	.500
Wisconsin–Stevens Point		–		–	3	–	3	.500
Kansas		–		–	5	–	6	.455
Lehigh		–		–	4	–	5	.444
Maine		–		–	7	–	9	.438
Army		–		–	3	–	4	.429
Mount Union		–		–	6	–	8	.429
West Virginia		–		–	6	–	9	.400
Temple		–		–	3	–	5	.375
Baker		–		–	5	–	10	.333
Gettysburg		–		–	3	–	6	.333
Wooster		–		–	3	–	8	.273
Kentucky		–		–	1	–	4	.200
Lake Forest		–		–	0	–	5	.000
New Mexico A&M		–		–	0	–	1	.000
Washington		–		–	0	–	2	.000
Wesleyan (Conn.)		–		–	0	–	12	.000

The 1904–05 Drexel Blue and Gold men's basketball team represented Drexel Institute of Art, Science and Industry during the 1904–05 men's basketball season. The Blue and Gold, who played without a head coach, played their home games at Main Building.

Drexel participated in the Philadelphia Interscholastic League, also known as the Interscholastic Basketball Association, which also included Brown Preparatory School, Camden High School, Central High School, Central Manual Training School, Eastburn Academy, Friends' Central School, and Northeast Manual Training School. Spring Garden School was planned to participate, but was replaced by Friends' Central. All league games were played at St. James Hall, located at 38th and Market streets. Drexel finished 6–8 in these league games, which was won by Central High School with a record of 14–0.

== Roster ==
1904–05 Drexel Dragons men's basketball team
Players
Coaches

Pos.	#	Name	Height	Weight	Year	Previous school	Hometown
		Beatty (C)	—	—
		Sauerhoff	—	—
		H.F. Machado (I)	—	—
		J.M. Maloney	—	—
		Mack	—	—
		Frank Griffin	—	—

Head coach

- No coach

Assistant coach(es)

Legend

- (C) Team captain
- (S) Suspended
- (I) Ineligible
- (W) Walk-on
- Injured
- Current redshirt

- In January, 1905, Machado suffered a broken hand and was replaced with Griffith

== Schedule ==
Date time, TV	Rank^{#}	Opponent^{#}	Result	Record	High points	High rebounds	High assists	Site (attendance) city, state
Regular season
December 14, 1904*		vs. Brown Prep	L 8–16		–	–	–	St. James Hall; Philadelphia, PA
December 23, 1904*		vs. Eastburn Academy	W 23–8		–	–	–	St. James Hall; Philadelphia, PA
December 1904*		Friends' Central School	W 27–14		–	–	–	
January 4, 1905*		vs. Spring Garden School						St. James Hall; Philadelphia, PA
January 1905*		Bloomsburg Normal	L –		–	–	–	
January 1905*		Wyoming Seminary	L –		–	–	–	
January 13, 1905*		vs. Camden High School (NJ)	L		–	–	–	St. James Hall; Philadelphia, PA
January 1905*		Morris Guards	L –		–	–	–	
January 20, 1905*		vs. Central Manual Trade School	L		–	–	–	St. James Hall; Philadelphia, PA
January 25, 1905*		vs. Northeast Manual Training School	L		–	–	–	St. James Hall; Philadelphia, PA
February 1, 1905*		vs. Central High School	L		–	–	–	St. James Hall; Philadelphia, PA
February 3, 1905*		Perkiomen School	W 36–17		–	–	–	
February 8, 1905*		vs. Brown Prep						St. James Hall; Philadelphia, PA
February 17, 1905*		vs. Eastburn Academy						St. James Hall; Philadelphia, PA
February 24, 1905*		vs. Spring Garden School						St. James Hall; Philadelphia, PA
March 3, 1905*		vs. Camden High School (NJ)						St. James Hall; Philadelphia, PA
March 10, 1905*		vs. Central Manual Trade School						St. James Hall; Philadelphia, PA
March 17, 1905*		vs. Northeast Manual Training School						St. James Hall; Philadelphia, PA
March 24, 1905*		vs. Central High School	L		–	–	–	St. James Hall; Philadelphia, PA
Unknown*		Temple	W 28–22		–	–	–	
*Non-conference game. ^{#}Rankings from AP. (#) Tournament seedings in parentheses. All times are in Eastern Time.
