= 1905 NCAA Men's Basketball All-Americans =

- Awarded for: 1904–05 collegiate men's basketball season

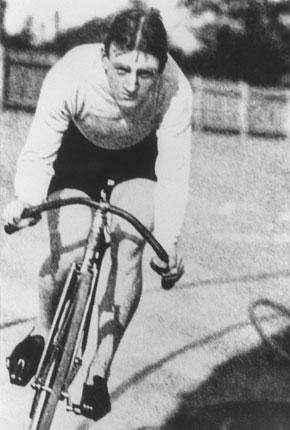
Marcus Hurley was a three-time Helms Foundation All-America selection at Columbia beginning in 1905.

The 1905 College Basketball All-American team, as chosen retroactively by the Helms Athletic Foundation. The player highlighted in gold was chosen as the Helms Foundation College Basketball Player of the Year retroactively in 1944.

Player	Team
Harry A. Fisher	Columbia
Marcus Hurley	Columbia
Willard Hyatt	Yale
Gilmore Kinney	Yale
C. D. McLees	Wisconsin
James Ozanne	Chicago
Walter Runge	Colgate
Chris Steinmetz	Wisconsin
George Tuck	Minnesota
Oliver deGray Vanderbilt	Princeton

== See also ==
- 1904–05 collegiate men's basketball season in the United States
