= Clarence Jamison =

Clarence Jamison may refer to:

- Clarence B. Jamison (1857–?), American football, basketball, and track and field coach
- Clarence C. Jamison (1918–2014), American combat fighter pilot
