= List of Purdue Boilermakers men's basketball head coaches =

The following is a list of Purdue Boilermakers men's basketball head coaches. The Boilermakers have had 18 coaches in their 126-season history. The team is currently coached by Matt Painter.

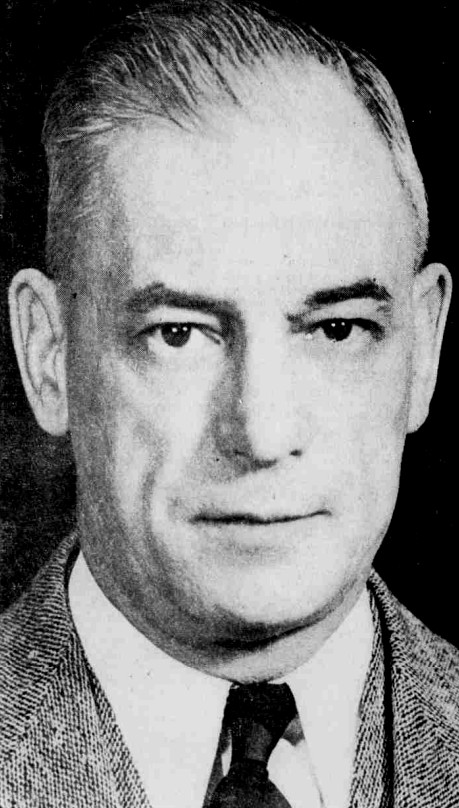
Ward "Piggy" Lambert has the longest coaching tenure at Purdue.

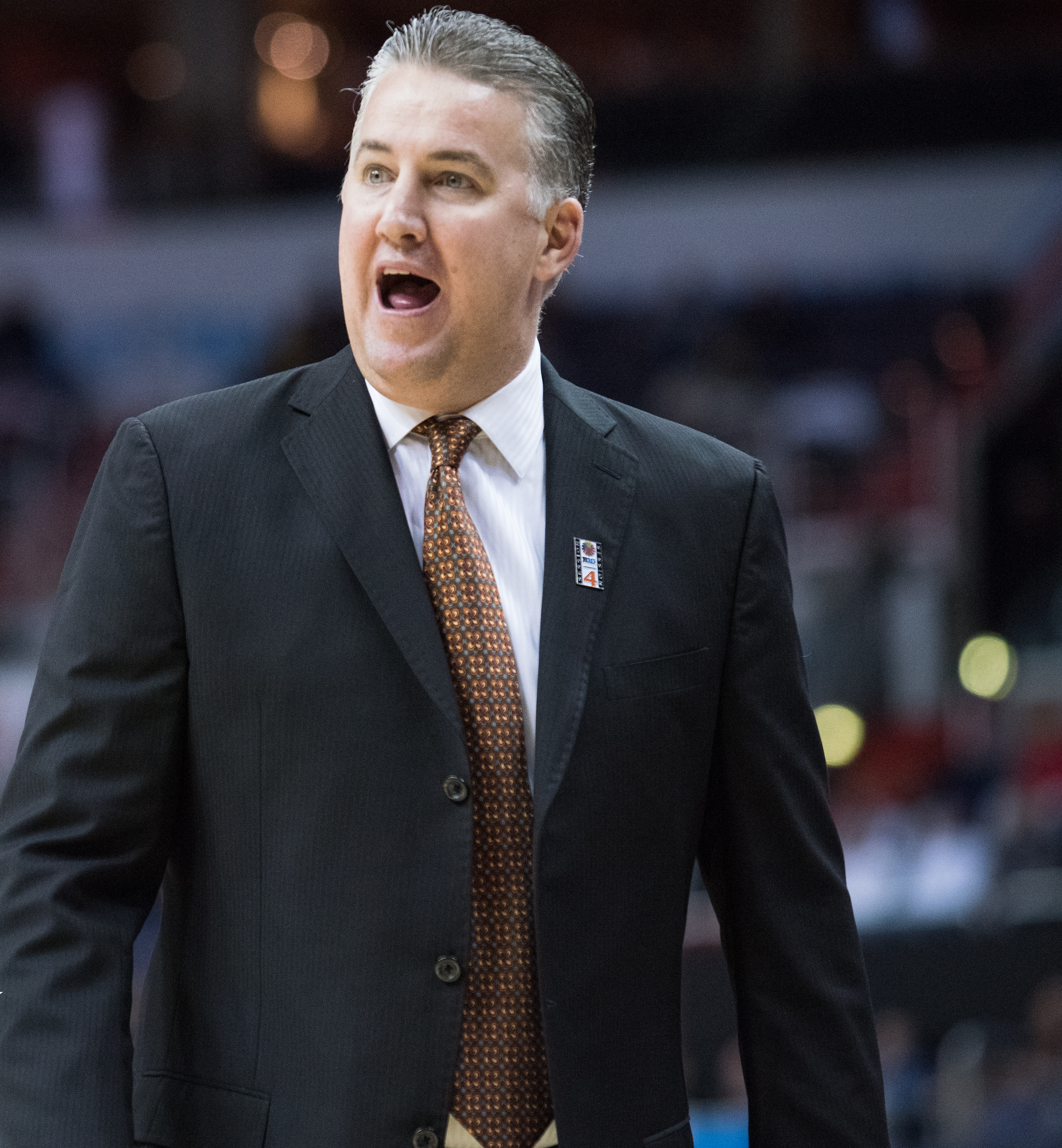
Current Purdue head coach, Matt Painter

*	Elected to the Naismith Memorial Basketball Hall of Fame as a coach
BHOF	Naismith Memorial Basketball Hall of Fame
NCHOF	National Collegiate Basketball Hall of Fame
NABC	National Association of Basketball Coaches Coach of the Year
LOCA	John Wooden Legends of Coaching Award
HIA	Henry Iba Award
UPI	United Press International College Basketball Coach of the Year
AP	Associated Press College Basketball Coach of the Year
USBWA	United States Basketball Writers Association District V Coach of the Year
B1G	Big Ten Conference Men's Basketball Coach of the Year

Tenure	Coach	Years	Wins	Losses	Pct.	Awards
1896–97	F. Homer Curtis	1	1	1	.500	
1899–1901	Alpha Jamison	2	12	1	.923	
1901–02	Charles Best	1	10	3	.769	
1902–03	C.I. Freeman	1	8	0	1.000	
1903–04	No official coach	1	11	2	.846	
1904–05	James Nufer	1	3	6	.333	
1905–08	C.B. Jamison	3	16	24	.400	
1908–09	E. J. Stewart	1	8	4	.667	
1909–12	Ralph Jones	3	32	9	.780	
1912–16	R.E. Vaughn	4	21	32	.396	
1916–17, 1918–46	Ward "Piggy" Lambert*	29	371	152	.709	BHOF (1960); NCHOF (2006)
1917–18	J.J. Maloney	1	11	5	.688	
1946–50	Mel Taube	4+ (Note: Taube coached part of the 1945–46 season after Lambert's retirement)	45	46	.495	
1950–65	Ray Eddy	15	176	164	.518	
1965–72	George King	7	109	64	.630	
1972–78	Fred Schaus	6	105	59	.640	
1978–80	Lee Rose	2	50	18	.735	
1980–2005	Gene Keady*	25	512	270	.655	BHOF (2023); NCHOF (2013); NABC (1994, 2000); LOCA (2007); HIA (1984, 1996); UPI (1996); AP (1996); B1G (1984, 1988, 1990, 1994, 1995, 1996, 2000)
2005–present	Matt Painter	19	447	203	.688	USBWA (2008, 2010, 2011, 2017, 2019); NABC (2019); B1G (2008, 2010, 2011, 2019)
Totals	18 coaches	126 seasons	1947	1064	.647	
