= 1904–05 Columbia Lions men's basketball team =

American college basketball season

1904–05 Columbia Lions men's basketball

EIBL Champions Helms Foundation National Champions
- Conference: Eastern Intercollegiate Basketball League
- Record: 19–1 (8–0 EIBL)
- Head coach: No coach
- Home arena: University Heights Gymnasium

1904–05 Eastern Intercollegiate Basketball League standings
	Conf.				Overall
Team	W		L	PCT	W		L	PCT
Columbia	8	–	0	1.000	19	–	1	.950
Yale	5	–	3	.625	22	–	13	.629
Princeton	4	–	4	.500	8	–	5	.615
Cornell	2	–	6	.250	5	–	16	.238
Penn	1	–	7	.125	9	–	14	.391

The 1904–05 Columbia Lions men's basketball team represented Columbia University in intercollegiate basketball during the 1904–05 season. The team finished the season with a 19–1 record, was retroactively named the national champion by the Helms Athletic Foundation, and was retroactively listed as the top team of the season by the Premo-Porretta Power Poll. Two players were named to the first-ever college basketball All-American team at the end of the season: Harry Fisher and Marcus Hurley.

== Schedule ==
Date time, TV	Rank^{#}	Opponent^{#}	Result	Record	Site city, state
Regular season
*		at Pratt	W 34–18	1–0	Brooklyn, NY
*		at Co. F. Norwalk	W 21–9	2–0	Norwalk, CT
*		at Central YMCA	W 25–22	3–0	
*		at Newport YMCA	W 24–22	4–0	
*		at Fall River YMCA	W 18–11	5–0	
*		at Fitchburg YMCA	W 19–16	6–0	
*		at Washington Continentals	L 7–17	6–1	
*		at Army	W 29–25	7–1	West Point, NY
		Cornell	W 30–11	8–1 (1–0)	University Heights Gymnasium; Upper Manhattan, NY
1/17/1905*		Wisconsin	W 21–15	9–1	University Heights Gymnasium; Upper Manhattan, NY
		at Cornell	W 23–17	10–1 (2–0)	Ithaca, NY
*		at Rochester	W 36–24	11–1	Rochester, NY
*		at Second Signal Corporation	W 26–23	12–1	
		Yale	W 14–12	13–1 (3–0)	University Heights Gymnasium; Upper Manhattan, NY
*		Minnesota	W 27–15	14–1	University Heights Gymnasium; Upper Manhattan, NY
		at Princeton	W 32–28	15–1 (4–0)	University Gymnasium; Princeton, NJ
		Princeton	W 33–19	16–1 (5–0)	University Heights Gymnasium; Upper Manhattan, NY
		at Yale	W 24–21	17–1 (6–0)	New Haven, CT
		at Penn	W 27–17	18–1 (7–0)	Philadelphia, PA
		Penn	W 56–16	19–1 (8–0)	University Heights Gymnasium; Upper Manhattan, NY
*Non-conference game. ^{#}Rankings from AP Poll. (#) Tournament seedings in parentheses.
