= 1904–05 Kansas Jayhawks men's basketball team =

American college basketball season

1904–05 Kansas Jayhawks men's basketball
- Conference: Independent
- Record: 5–6
- Head coach: James Naismith (7th season)
- Captains: Ira Adams; Charles Bliss
- Home arena: Snow Hall

1904–05 collegiate men's basketball independents standings
	Conf.				Overall
Team	W		L	PCT	W		L	PCT
Arizona		–		–	1	–	0	1.000
Augustana (Ill.)		–		–	9	–	0	1.000
Denver		–		–	1	–	0	1.000
Muskingum		–		–	8	–	0	1.000
New Mexico		–		–	1	–	0	1.000
Wabash		–		–	8	–	0	1.000
Washington University		–		–	1	–	0	1.000
Wyoming		–		–	1	–	0	1.000
Williams		–		–	20	–	2	.909
Bucknell		–		–	8	–	1	.889
Dayton		–		–	6	–	1	.857
Ohio State		–		–	12	–	2	.857
Allegheny		–		–	10	–	2	.833
Lewis		–		–	20	–	5	.800
Grove City		–		–	15	–	4	.789
North Dakota		–		–	7	–	2	.778
Wheaton (Ill.)		–		–	10	–	3	.769
Brigham Young		–		–	9	–	3	.750
Butler		–		–	6	–	2	.750
Fordham		–		–	18	–	6	.750
Penn State		–		–	6	–	2	.750
Montana State		–		–	5	–	2	.714
Harvard		–		–	11	–	5	.688
Nebraska		–		–	11	–	5	.688
Brown		–		–	13	–	6	.684
Cincinnati		–		–	6	–	3	.667
Dartmouth		–		–	20	–	10	.667
North Dakota Agricultural		–		–	6	–	3	.667
Syracuse		–		–	14	–	7	.667
Denison		–		–	9	–	5	.643
Canisius		–		–	7	–	4	.636
Oberlin		–		–	7	–	4	.636
Michigan State		–		–	5	–	3	.625
Oregon Agricultural		–		–	5	–	3	.625
Southwestern (Kan.)		–		–	5	–	3	.625
Colorado		–		–	3	–	2	.600
Holy Cross		–		–	6	–	4	.600
Washington State		–		–	3	–	2	.600
Colgate		–		–	10	–	7	.588
Akron		–		–	8	–	6	.571
Bradley		–		–	5	–	4	.556
Westminster (Pa.)		–		–	6	–	5	.545
Bloomsburg		–		–	3	–	3	.500
Colorado Architectural		–		–	2	–	2	.500
Connecticut		–		–	3	–	3	.500
Illinois State		–		–	4	–	4	.500
Indiana State		–		–	5	–	5	.500
Manhattan		–		–	3	–	3	.500
Wisconsin–Stevens Point		–		–	3	–	3	.500
Kansas		–		–	5	–	6	.455
Lehigh		–		–	4	–	5	.444
Maine		–		–	7	–	9	.438
Army		–		–	3	–	4	.429
Mount Union		–		–	6	–	8	.429
West Virginia		–		–	6	–	9	.400
Temple		–		–	3	–	5	.375
Baker		–		–	5	–	10	.333
Gettysburg		–		–	3	–	6	.333
Wooster		–		–	3	–	8	.273
Kentucky		–		–	1	–	4	.200
Lake Forest		–		–	0	–	5	.000
New Mexico A&M		–		–	0	–	1	.000
Washington		–		–	0	–	2	.000
Wesleyan (Conn.)		–		–	0	–	12	.000

The 1904–05 Kansas Jayhawks men's basketball team represented the University of Kansas in its seventh season of collegiate basketball. The head coach was James Naismith, the game inventor, who served his 7th year. The Jayhawks finished the season 5–6. Future Jayhawks head coach Phog Allen played for the team.

== Roster ==
- Ira Adams
- Frank Barlow
- Charles Bliss
- Forrest Allen
- Milton Miller
- William Miller
- Charles Siler
- Roscoe Winnagle

== Schedule ==
Date time, TV	Opponent	Result	Record	Site city, state
Jan. 21, 1905*	Emporia State	W 46–11	1–0	Lawrence, Kansas
Jan. 29, 1905*	at Nebraska Wesleyan	L 37–52	1–1	Lincoln, Nebraska
Jan. 30, 1905*	at Omaha YMCA	L 24–31	1–2	Omaha, Nebraska
Jan. 31, 1905*	at Des Moines YMCA	L 19–37	1–3	Des Moines, Iowa
Feb. 1, 1905* no, no	at Oskaloosa YMCA	W 37–14	2–3	Oskaloosa, Iowa
Feb. 2, 1905*	at Oskaloosa YMCA	W 56–21	3–3	Oskaloosa, IA
Feb. 3, 1905*	at Ottumwa YMCA	L 22–34	3–4	Ottumwa, Iowa
Feb. 4, 1905*	at Fairfield YMCA	L 20–29	3–5	Fairfield, Iowa
Feb. 11, 1905*	Fraternal Aid	L 20–37	3–6	Lawrence, Kansas
Feb. 17, 1905*	Osage City	W 18–8	4–6	Lawrence, Kansas
Feb. 18, 1905*	Emporia State	W 47–18	5–6	Lawrence, Kansas
*Non-conference game. ^{#}Rankings from AP Poll. (#) Tournament seedings in parentheses. All times are in Central Standard Time.
