= George Tuck (basketball) =

American basketball player (1882–1952)

Personal information
- Born: April 12, 1882 Minnesota
- Died: August 22, 1952 (aged 70) San Mateo, California

Career information
- High school: Central (Minneapolis, Minnesota)
- College: Minnesota (1902–1906)

Career highlights
- Consensus All-American (1905)

George Albert Tuck (April 12, 1882 – August 22, 1952) was a college basketball player for the Minnesota Golden Gophers. Tuck, a center, was one of the two first Big Ten Conference basketball players to be named as an All-American, along with Christian Steinmetz, when he made the team in 1905. Minnesota won the first 29 games of Tuck's career and finished with a record of 45–9–1 during his time as a Golden Gopher. Tuck also played for Minnesota's football team.
