= James Ozanne =

American basketball player

Personal information
- Born: June 30, 1882
- Died: January 11, 1963 (aged 80)

Career information
- College: Chicago

Career highlights
- Consensus All-American (1905)

James Roy Ozanne (June 30, 1882 – January 11, 1963) was an All-American basketball player at the University of Chicago in 1904–05. He was part of the first group of college basketball players to be honored as such. The Helms Athletic Foundation, which began in 1936, retroactively named the All-American teams from 1905 to 1935. Between 1905 and 1929, the Helms All-American teams are considered to be consensus selections.
