= 1904–05 Penn State Nittany Lions basketball team =

American college basketball season

1904–05 Penn State Nittany Lions men's basketball
- Conference: Independent
- Record: 5–4
- Head coach: student coaches
- Captain: William R. Dunn
- Home arena: Armory

1904–05 collegiate men's basketball independents standings
	Conf.				Overall
Team	W		L	PCT	W		L	PCT
Arizona		–		–	1	–	0	1.000
Augustana (Ill.)		–		–	9	–	0	1.000
Denver		–		–	1	–	0	1.000
Muskingum		–		–	8	–	0	1.000
New Mexico		–		–	1	–	0	1.000
Wabash		–		–	8	–	0	1.000
Washington University		–		–	1	–	0	1.000
Wyoming		–		–	1	–	0	1.000
Williams		–		–	20	–	2	.909
Bucknell		–		–	8	–	1	.889
Dayton		–		–	6	–	1	.857
Ohio State		–		–	12	–	2	.857
Allegheny		–		–	10	–	2	.833
Lewis		–		–	20	–	5	.800
Grove City		–		–	15	–	4	.789
North Dakota		–		–	7	–	2	.778
Wheaton (Ill.)		–		–	10	–	3	.769
Brigham Young		–		–	9	–	3	.750
Butler		–		–	6	–	2	.750
Fordham		–		–	18	–	6	.750
Penn State		–		–	6	–	2	.750
Montana State		–		–	5	–	2	.714
Harvard		–		–	11	–	5	.688
Nebraska		–		–	11	–	5	.688
Brown		–		–	13	–	6	.684
Cincinnati		–		–	6	–	3	.667
Dartmouth		–		–	20	–	10	.667
North Dakota Agricultural		–		–	6	–	3	.667
Syracuse		–		–	14	–	7	.667
Denison		–		–	9	–	5	.643
Canisius		–		–	7	–	4	.636
Oberlin		–		–	7	–	4	.636
Michigan State		–		–	5	–	3	.625
Oregon Agricultural		–		–	5	–	3	.625
Southwestern (Kan.)		–		–	5	–	3	.625
Colorado		–		–	3	–	2	.600
Holy Cross		–		–	6	–	4	.600
Washington State		–		–	3	–	2	.600
Colgate		–		–	10	–	7	.588
Akron		–		–	8	–	6	.571
Bradley		–		–	5	–	4	.556
Westminster (Pa.)		–		–	6	–	5	.545
Bloomsburg		–		–	3	–	3	.500
Colorado Architectural		–		–	2	–	2	.500
Connecticut		–		–	3	–	3	.500
Illinois State		–		–	4	–	4	.500
Indiana State		–		–	5	–	5	.500
Manhattan		–		–	3	–	3	.500
Wisconsin–Stevens Point		–		–	3	–	3	.500
Kansas		–		–	5	–	6	.455
Lehigh		–		–	4	–	5	.444
Maine		–		–	7	–	9	.438
Army		–		–	3	–	4	.429
Mount Union		–		–	6	–	8	.429
West Virginia		–		–	6	–	9	.400
Temple		–		–	3	–	5	.375
Baker		–		–	5	–	10	.333
Gettysburg		–		–	3	–	6	.333
Wooster		–		–	3	–	8	.273
Kentucky		–		–	1	–	4	.200
Lake Forest		–		–	0	–	5	.000
New Mexico A&M		–		–	0	–	1	.000
Washington		–		–	0	–	2	.000
Wesleyan (Conn.)		–		–	0	–	12	.000

The 1904–05 Penn State Nittany Lions basketball team represented Penn State University during the 1904–05 college men's basketball season. The team finished with a final record of 5–4.

== Schedule ==
Date time, TV	Opponent	Result	Record	Site city, state
1/16/1905*	at Altoona	L 16–23	0–1	
1/20/1905*	Altoona Athletic Association	W 34–18	1–1	Armory; University Park, PA
2/2/1905*	Wyoming Seminary	W 33–16	2–1	Armory; University Park, PA
2/17/1905*	Dickinson	W 41–13	3–1	Armory; University Park, PA
2/22/1905*	at Pennsylvania	W 29–24	4–1	Philadelphia, PA
2/23/1905*	at Swarthmore	L 15–26	4–2	Swarthmore, PA
2/24/1905*	at Franklin & Marshall	W 33–27	5–2	Lancaster, PA
2/25/1905*	at Dickinson	W 31–12	6–2	
*Non-conference game. (#) Tournament seedings in parentheses.
