= Walter Runge =

American basketball player (1884–1966)

Personal information
- Born: September 11, 1884 Newark, New Jersey, U.S.
- Died: February 27, 1966 (aged 81) Glen Ridge, New Jersey, U.S.

Career information
- College: Colgate (1902–1906)

Career highlights
- Consensus All-American (1905)

Walter Runge (September 11, 1884 – February 27, 1966) was an All-American basketball player at Colgate between 1902 and 1906. He was part of the first group of college basketball players to be honored as such. The Helms Athletic Foundation, which began in 1936, retroactively named the All-American teams from 1905 to 1935. Between 1905 and 1929, the Helms All-American teams are considered to be consensus selections.

Runge earned 13 total varsity letters at Colgate, including four from his time as the football team's quarterback. After graduating from Colgate, Runge became a doctor and in 1939 was living in East Orange, New Jersey. He and his wife had a daughter named Lola. When Dick Harlow left his post as head football coach in 1925, Runge was part of a group of five notable Colgate football alumni tasked with finding a new coach. Runge returned to Colgate again in 1950 for a celebration of the first 50 years of Colgate basketball. In 1959, he was nominated for induction into the College Football Hall of Fame, but did not receive enough votes. Runge was inducted into the Colgate University Athletics Hall of Honor in 1980.
