= Northeast Manual Training School =

- U.S. National Register of Historic Places
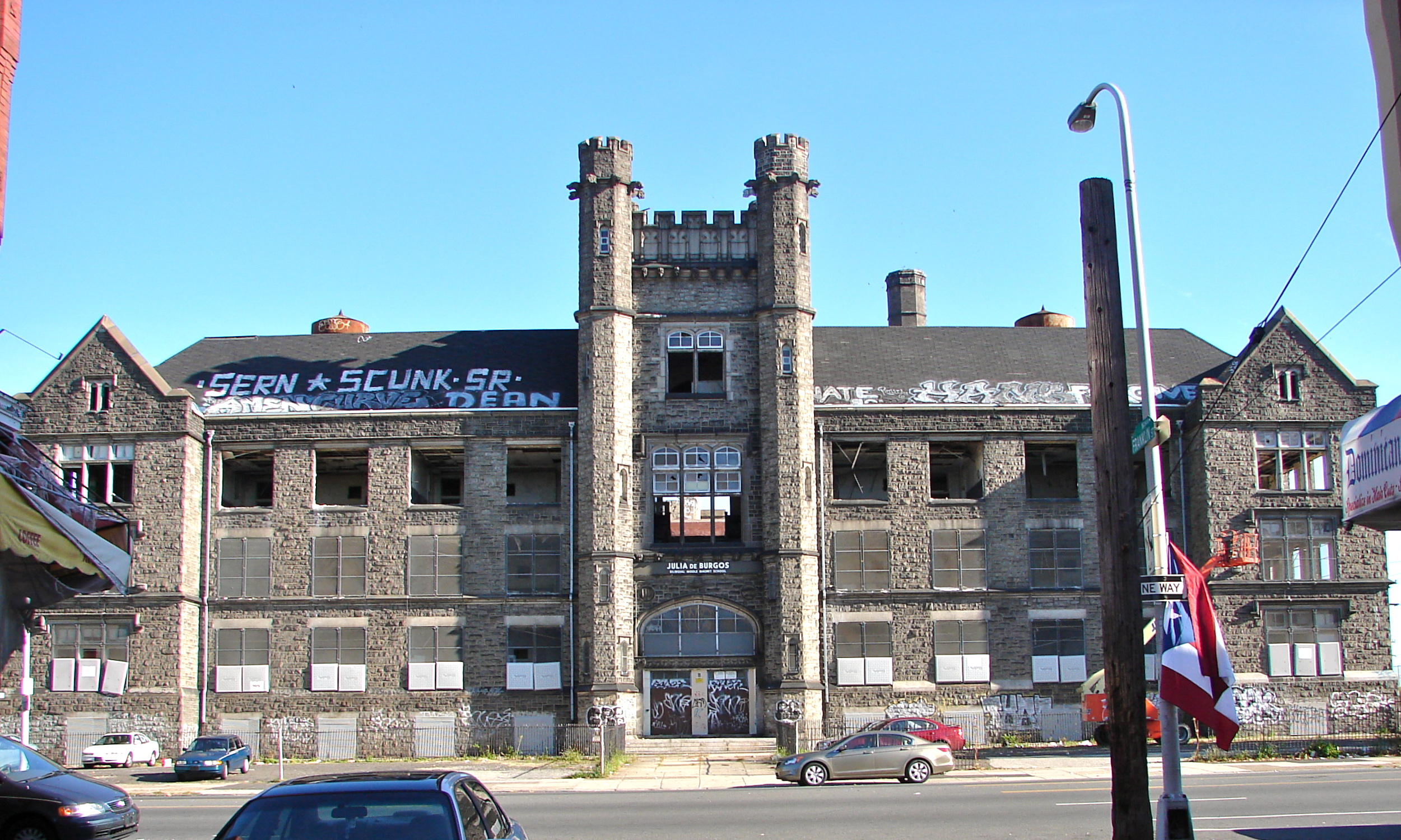
- Northeast Manual Training School, September 2010

- Location within Philadelphia Location within Pennsylvania Location within the United States
- Location: 701 Lehigh St., Philadelphia, Pennsylvania
- Coordinates: 39°59′36″N 75°08′39″W
- Area: 3 acres (1.2 ha)
- Built: 1903
- Built by: Henderson & Co.
- Architect: Titus, Lloyd
- Architectural style: Romanesque
- MPS: Philadelphia Public Schools TR
- NRHP reference No.: 86003279
- Added to NRHP: December 4, 1986

The Northeast Manual Training School, also known as Edison High School, was an historic school building in Fairhill, Philadelphia, Pennsylvania, United States.

It was added to the National Register of Historic Places in 1986.

== History and architectural features ==
Built between 1903 and 1905 as a 3 1/2-story, random-coursed, granite building, it was designed in the Romanesque style. It featured a center turret, flanked by projecting gable ends.

A fire on August 3, 2011, destroyed most of the interior, but the structural walls remained in good condition. The school, which had been closed in 2009 and then inhabited by squatters, was demolished in late 2011.
