= 1904–05 Kentucky Wildcats men's basketball team =

1904–05 season of University of Kentucky men's basketball team

1904–05 Kentucky Wildcats men's basketball
- Conference: Independent
- Record: 1–4
- Head coach: Unnamed (1st season)
- Home arena: State College Gymnasium

1904–05 collegiate men's basketball independents standings
	Conf.				Overall
Team	W		L	PCT	W		L	PCT
Arizona		–		–	1	–	0	1.000
Augustana (Ill.)		–		–	9	–	0	1.000
Denver		–		–	1	–	0	1.000
Muskingum		–		–	8	–	0	1.000
New Mexico		–		–	1	–	0	1.000
Wabash		–		–	8	–	0	1.000
Washington University		–		–	1	–	0	1.000
Wyoming		–		–	1	–	0	1.000
Williams		–		–	20	–	2	.909
Bucknell		–		–	8	–	1	.889
Dayton		–		–	6	–	1	.857
Ohio State		–		–	12	–	2	.857
Allegheny		–		–	10	–	2	.833
Lewis		–		–	20	–	5	.800
Grove City		–		–	15	–	4	.789
North Dakota		–		–	7	–	2	.778
Wheaton (Ill.)		–		–	10	–	3	.769
Brigham Young		–		–	9	–	3	.750
Butler		–		–	6	–	2	.750
Fordham		–		–	18	–	6	.750
Penn State		–		–	6	–	2	.750
Montana State		–		–	5	–	2	.714
Harvard		–		–	11	–	5	.688
Nebraska		–		–	11	–	5	.688
Brown		–		–	13	–	6	.684
Cincinnati		–		–	6	–	3	.667
Dartmouth		–		–	20	–	10	.667
North Dakota Agricultural		–		–	6	–	3	.667
Syracuse		–		–	14	–	7	.667
Denison		–		–	9	–	5	.643
Canisius		–		–	7	–	4	.636
Oberlin		–		–	7	–	4	.636
Michigan State		–		–	5	–	3	.625
Oregon Agricultural		–		–	5	–	3	.625
Southwestern (Kan.)		–		–	5	–	3	.625
Colorado		–		–	3	–	2	.600
Holy Cross		–		–	6	–	4	.600
Washington State		–		–	3	–	2	.600
Colgate		–		–	10	–	7	.588
Akron		–		–	8	–	6	.571
Bradley		–		–	5	–	4	.556
Westminster (Pa.)		–		–	6	–	5	.545
Bloomsburg		–		–	3	–	3	.500
Colorado Architectural		–		–	2	–	2	.500
Connecticut		–		–	3	–	3	.500
Illinois State		–		–	4	–	4	.500
Indiana State		–		–	5	–	5	.500
Manhattan		–		–	3	–	3	.500
Wisconsin–Stevens Point		–		–	3	–	3	.500
Kansas		–		–	5	–	6	.455
Lehigh		–		–	4	–	5	.444
Maine		–		–	7	–	9	.438
Army		–		–	3	–	4	.429
Mount Union		–		–	6	–	8	.429
West Virginia		–		–	6	–	9	.400
Temple		–		–	3	–	5	.375
Baker		–		–	5	–	10	.333
Gettysburg		–		–	3	–	6	.333
Wooster		–		–	3	–	8	.273
Kentucky		–		–	1	–	4	.200
Lake Forest		–		–	0	–	5	.000
New Mexico A&M		–		–	0	–	1	.000
Washington		–		–	0	–	2	.000
Wesleyan (Conn.)		–		–	0	–	12	.000

The 1904–05 Kentucky State men's basketball team competed on behalf of the University of Kentucky during the 1904–05 season. The team finished with a final record of 1–4.

== Roster ==
1904–05 Kentucky Wildcats men's basketball team
Players
Coaches

Pos.	#	Name	Height	Weight	Year	Previous school	Hometown
C		Joe Coons	—	—	Jr	Unknown	Mount Sterling, Kentucky
F		Charles Wright	—	—	Sr	Unknown	Lexington, Kentucky
		William Kemper	—	—	Jr	Millersburg Military Institute	Millersburg, Kentucky
F		Stanley Baer	—	—	So	Unknown	Louisville, Kentucky
G		Don Branson	—	—	So	Unknown	Yosemite, Kentucky
G		Lawrence Waters	—	—	So	Unknown	Middletown, Kentucky
C		Thomas Bryant	—	—	Fr	Kentucky State College Prep School	Nicholasville, Kentucky

Head coach

- Unnamed

Assistant coach(es)

{{{asst_coach}}}

Legend

- (C) Team captain
- (S) Suspended
- (I) Ineligible
- (W) Walk-on
- Injured
- Current redshirt

== Schedule ==
Date time, TV	Rank^{#}	Opponent^{#}	Result	Record	Site city, state
Regular Season
1/13/1905*		Georgetown College	L 9-14	0–1	State College Gymnasium; Lexington, KY
1/21/1905*		Cincinnati YMCA	L 22–43	0–2	Kentucky University; Lexington, KY
1/27/1905*		Kentucky University (now Transylvania)	W 30–29	1–2	State College Gymnasium; Lexington, KY
2/4/1905*		Kentucky University (now Transylvania)	L 1-22	1–3	Kentucky University); Lexington, KY
2/22/1905*		Kentucky University (now Transylvania)	L 23–33	1–4	State College Gymnasium; Lexington, KY
*Non-conference game. ^{#}Rankings from AP Poll. (#) Tournament seedings in parentheses.
