= 1904–05 West Virginia Mountaineers men's basketball team =

American college basketball season

1904–05 West Virginia Mountaineers men's basketball
- Conference: Independent
- Record: 6–9
- Head coach: Anthony Chez (1st season)
- Captain: James Gronninger

1904–05 collegiate men's basketball independents standings
	Conf.				Overall
Team	W		L	PCT	W		L	PCT
Arizona		–		–	1	–	0	1.000
Augustana (Ill.)		–		–	9	–	0	1.000
Denver		–		–	1	–	0	1.000
Muskingum		–		–	8	–	0	1.000
New Mexico		–		–	1	–	0	1.000
Wabash		–		–	8	–	0	1.000
Washington University		–		–	1	–	0	1.000
Wyoming		–		–	1	–	0	1.000
Williams		–		–	20	–	2	.909
Bucknell		–		–	8	–	1	.889
Dayton		–		–	6	–	1	.857
Ohio State		–		–	12	–	2	.857
Allegheny		–		–	10	–	2	.833
Lewis		–		–	20	–	5	.800
Grove City		–		–	15	–	4	.789
North Dakota		–		–	7	–	2	.778
Wheaton (Ill.)		–		–	10	–	3	.769
Brigham Young		–		–	9	–	3	.750
Butler		–		–	6	–	2	.750
Fordham		–		–	18	–	6	.750
Penn State		–		–	6	–	2	.750
Montana State		–		–	5	–	2	.714
Harvard		–		–	11	–	5	.688
Nebraska		–		–	11	–	5	.688
Brown		–		–	13	–	6	.684
Cincinnati		–		–	6	–	3	.667
Dartmouth		–		–	20	–	10	.667
North Dakota Agricultural		–		–	6	–	3	.667
Syracuse		–		–	14	–	7	.667
Denison		–		–	9	–	5	.643
Canisius		–		–	7	–	4	.636
Oberlin		–		–	7	–	4	.636
Michigan State		–		–	5	–	3	.625
Oregon Agricultural		–		–	5	–	3	.625
Southwestern (Kan.)		–		–	5	–	3	.625
Colorado		–		–	3	–	2	.600
Holy Cross		–		–	6	–	4	.600
Washington State		–		–	3	–	2	.600
Colgate		–		–	10	–	7	.588
Akron		–		–	8	–	6	.571
Bradley		–		–	5	–	4	.556
Westminster (Pa.)		–		–	6	–	5	.545
Bloomsburg		–		–	3	–	3	.500
Colorado Architectural		–		–	2	–	2	.500
Connecticut		–		–	3	–	3	.500
Illinois State		–		–	4	–	4	.500
Indiana State		–		–	5	–	5	.500
Manhattan		–		–	3	–	3	.500
Wisconsin–Stevens Point		–		–	3	–	3	.500
Kansas		–		–	5	–	6	.455
Lehigh		–		–	4	–	5	.444
Maine		–		–	7	–	9	.438
Army		–		–	3	–	4	.429
Mount Union		–		–	6	–	8	.429
West Virginia		–		–	6	–	9	.400
Temple		–		–	3	–	5	.375
Baker		–		–	5	–	10	.333
Gettysburg		–		–	3	–	6	.333
Wooster		–		–	3	–	8	.273
Kentucky		–		–	1	–	4	.200
Lake Forest		–		–	0	–	5	.000
New Mexico A&M		–		–	0	–	1	.000
Washington		–		–	0	–	2	.000
Wesleyan (Conn.)		–		–	0	–	12	.000

The 1904–05 West Virginia Mountaineers men's basketball team represented the University of West Virginia during the 1904–05 college men's basketball season. The team captain was James Gronninger. The Mountaineers finished with an overall record of 6–9.

== Schedule ==
Date time, TV	Opponent	Result	Record	Site city, state
December 30, 1904*	Fairmont YMCA	W 42–15	1–0	Morgantown, WV
January 7, 1905*	Big Eastern Five	W 62–16	2–0	Morgantown, WV
January 14, 1905*	at East Liberty	W 35–5	3–0	Morgantown, WV
January 25, 1905*	at Geneva	L 16–17	3–1	Beaver Falls, PA
January 26, 1905*	at Westminster	L 10–39	3–2	Westminster, PA
January 27, 1905*	at Allegheny	L 5–44	3–3	Meadville, PA
January 28, 1905*	at Grove City	L 8–36	3–4	New Wilmington, PA
February 1, 1905*	Hiram	L 17–27	3–5	Morgantown, WV
February 4, 1905*	Waynesburg	W 80–01	4–5	Morgantown, WV
February 7, 1905*	at Steubenville AC	L 16–24	4–6	Steubenville, OH
February 8, 1905*	Mount Union	L 17–25	4–7	Alliance, OH
February 9, 1905*	Buchtel (Akron)	L 25–31	4–8	Morgantown, WV
February 10, 1905*	at Hiram	L 22–40	4–9	Hiram, OH
February 24, 1905*	All-Stars	W 38–08	5–9	Morgantown, WV
March 4, 1905*	W.U.P. (Pitt) Informal	W 40–09	6–9	Morgantown, WV
*Non-conference game. (#) Tournament seedings in parentheses.
