= C. D. McLees =

American basketball player

Career information
- College: Wisconsin

Career highlights
- Consensus All-American (1905)

C. D. McLees was an All-American basketball player at the University of Wisconsin–Madison in 1904–05. He was part of the first group of college basketball players to be honored as such, and it occurred during his senior year. The Helms Athletic Foundation, which began in 1936, retroactively named the All-American teams from 1905 to 1935. Between 1905 and 1929, the Helms All-American teams are considered to be consensus selections.
