= Oliver deGray Vanderbilt =

American basketball player

Personal information
- Born: August 23, 1884 Brick Township, New Jersey, US
- Died: January 26, 1960 (aged 75) Indian Hill, Ohio, US

Career information
- High school: East Orange (East Orange, New Jersey)
- College: Princeton (1902–1906)

Career highlights
- Consensus All-American (1905)

Oliver deGray Vanderbilt, Jr. (August 23, 1884 – January 26, 1960) was an All-American basketball player at Princeton University in 1904–05. He was part of the first group of college basketball players to be honored as such. The Helms Athletic Foundation, which began in 1936, retroactively named the All-American teams from 1905 to 1935. Between 1905 and 1929, the Helms All-American teams are considered to be consensus selections.

== Personal life ==
In 1912, Vanderbilt married Madelon Emma Weir (1892–1963), a daughter of Levi Candee Weir and Mary Emma Weir (née Weibel), of Cincinnati, Ohio. Her father was the chairman of the Adams Express Company. They had three children:

- Lefreda W. Vanderbilt (1913–1997), married firstly Philip John Schneider (1902–1985), with whom she had three children. She married secondly to Peter Folger Rhoades (1921–1997).
- Oliver DeGray Vanderbilt III (1914–2000), married Frances Montgomery Philips (1917–2000), with issue including Oliver "DeGray" Vanderbilt IV, a community activist based on Molokaʻi, Hawaii.
- Barbara Vanderbilt (1924–1980), married Warner Arms Peck Jr. (1920–1991), a radiologist and civil leader, with whom she had four children.

Vanderbilt passed away August 23, 1960 in Indian Hill, Ohio aged 75.
