= Christian Steinmetz =

American college basketball player

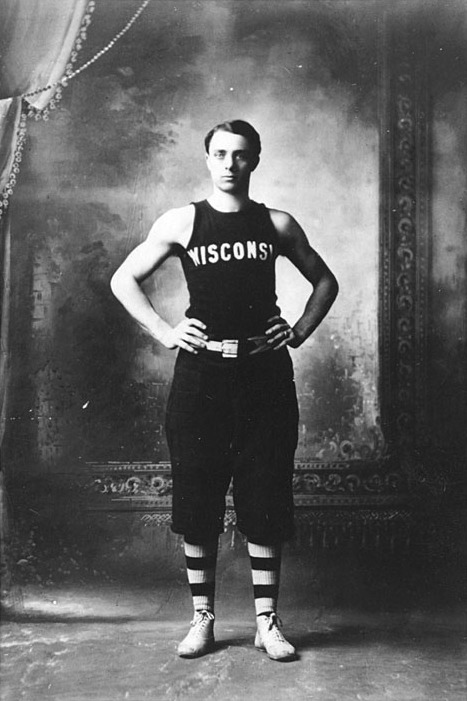
- Steinmetz with Wisconsin in 1905

Personal information
- Born: June 28, 1882 Milwaukee, Wisconsin, U.S.
- Died: June 11, 1963 (aged 80) Milwaukee, Wisconsin, U.S.
- Listed height: 5 ft 9 in (1.75 m)
- Listed weight: 137 lb (62 kg)

Career information
- High school: South Division (Milwaukee, Wisconsin)
- College: Wisconsin (1902–1905)
- Position: Forward

Career highlights
- Helms Player of the Year (1905); Consensus All-American (1905)
- Basketball Hall of Fame
- Collegiate Basketball Hall of Fame

Christian Steinmetz (June 28, 1882 – June 11, 1963) was an American basketball player. He played forward for the University of Wisconsin from 1903 to 1905. He was college basketball's leading scorer in the game's first 25 years from 1895 to 1920. He became known as the "Father of Wisconsin Basketball" and was inducted into the Naismith Memorial Basketball Hall of Fame in 1961.

== Early years ==
Steinmetz was born in Milwaukee, Wisconsin in 1882. He was the son of Chris, a Milwaukee real estate man, and Frances Steinmetz.

Steinmetz attended Milwaukee's South Division High School where he was a member of the school's basketball and track teams. He led South Division to the state high school basketball championship in 1902 and was the state champion in the high jump that year.

== University of Wisconsin ==
Steinmetz enrolled at the University of Wisconsin where he was a member of the Badgers' track and basketball teams from 1903 to 1905. Despite his modest size at 5 ft 9 in (1.75 m) and 137 pounds (62 kg), he became one of the greatest scorers in basketball history. One writer who saw him play wrote: "He was a human dynamo on the basketball floor. Possessed of an uncanny eye for the basket and a bulldog on defense, Steinmetz always seemed to be at the right place at the right time. He was to basketball what Willie Heston (of Michigan) was to football."

=== Evolution of the game ===
Steinmetz was credited with being an innovator in technique. In an era when the underhand, two-handed shot was the norm, Steinmetz often used a "one-hander." Steinmetz later recalled that the one-hander was "always good for three or four baskets before they caught on to it." He also had the ability to rebound or catch a pass and shoot while in the air, "a feat that was unheard of in those days." In 1958, Steinmetz told a reporter that the modern game was as different from the game he played as "hearts is from poker." He concluded that the biggest change in the game was eliminating the "center jump," in which there was a jump ball at center court after every score. He noted: "It makes basketball a percentage game. Whichever team is hitting for the best percentage of their shots wins. It used to be that the good team would get the ball again in the center jump and one team would pull farther ahead of the other."

Steinmetz played on the 1905 Wisconsin basketball team with College Football Hall of Fame coach Bob Zuppke and recalled that the game was rougher in its early days: "Zuppke and I played nine games in 10 nights, and were in every minute. Basketball in those days was football for lighter fellows. The officials allowed rougher play. Why, we wore moleskin pants or they would have tore them right off you the way they hung on."

=== 1903 and 1904 seasons ===
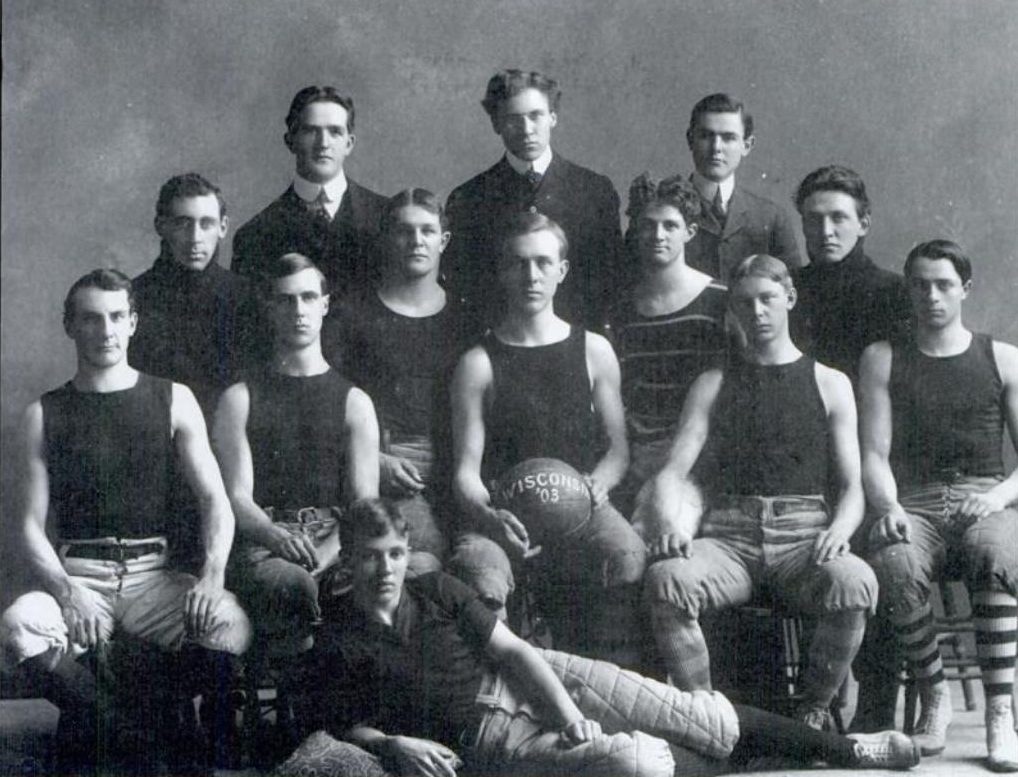
1903 Wisconsin basketball team (Steinmetz in middle holding ball)

Basketball was in its infancy at the University of Wisconsin when Steinmetz arrived. The team was jokingly called the "squat tag team," had no coach and received no financial support from the university. Players supplied their own equipment, and Steinmetz later recalled the worn condition of the balls they had to use: "We seldom saw a new ball. The ones we used had lumps and corners on them."

In 1904, Emmett Angell became the coach of the basketball team. The Badgers lost to Nebraska 24–22 for the western championship. Steinmetz recalled that Wisconsin lost the game when "a fan sitting right on the edge of the court grabbed our guard's arm and kept him from throwing the ball in as time ran out." Steinmetz noted that they were running a set play in which Steinmetz would break down court, and Zuppke would throw a long, lead pass to him. After the fan's illegal participation, a "free-for-all battle" broke out, and Nebraska was declared the winner.

=== 1905 season ===
As a senior in 1905, Steinmetz was the captain of a 1905 Wisconsin team won that all of its games against western teams and claimed the western championship with a 29–24 win over Amos Alonzo Stagg's University of Chicago basketball team. The team lost the national championship in a three-hour game against Columbia in New York. A controversy surrounded the loss to Columbia, as Columbia insisted over Wisconsin's objection in using its own umpire and referee. The Wisconsin players complained that fouls by the Columbia players were overlooked, and Steinmetz had his jaw broken in the game. Further complicating matters, Columbia and Wisconsin played under different rules, and the game took three hours to finish because of arguments over the rules. Steinmetz later recalled that he carried a rule book in his pocket during the game. Also, Columbia's baskets had no backboards and instead consisted of hoops mounted on poles, which the Columbia players shook when Wisconsin shot the ball. Despite the broken jaw, Steinmetz scored 11 of Wisconsin's 14 points in a 25–14 loss.

The Columbia game was part of a nine-game eastern trip. Steinmetz had received advance publicity and was being closely guarded. At University of Rochester, Bob Zuppke suggested that he take Steinmetz' place at forward to confuse the opposition. After the center jump, Steinmetz joined Zuppke at the forward spot. "We got several baskets before the other team woke up and made the necessary adjustment."

During the 18-game 1905 season, Steinmetz averaged 25.7 points per game on a team that averaged 37.8 points per game. He set scoring records, some of which remain Wisconsin records: most points in a game (50 points against Sparta), most points in a season (462 points in 18 games), most free throws in a game (26 against Two Rivers), most free throws in a season (238), and most free throw attempts in a season (317). Steinmetz's single-game, free-throw record, set at a time when one player took all of the team's free throws, has never been broken.

He scored 20 field goals in a game against Beloit College, falling one basket short of the national record. He later recalled, "The game was stopped five minutes early so Beloit could catch a train. Otherwise I might have had another record." He left Wisconsin with a career total of 962 points, a school record that stood for 40 years.

In Wisconsin's 1905 Badger yearbook, Steinmetz wrote about the team's championship season:

The team began its season by overwhelmingly defeating various teams throughout the State, and its first championship game was played against Beloit College. In our own gymnasium we defeated her by the large score of 80 to 10, and it was this game that furnished a criterion as to how strong a team Wisconsin really had. During our invasion of the East we played a longer and harder schedule than any university team had ever attempted. Playing the strongest and best teams of the East and under a very different interpretation of the basketball rules, we were able to make an excellent showing. Columbia University, the Eastern intercollegiate champions, defeated us by a score of 21 to 15 in a hard fought game and not until the last minutes of play did she wrest the game from our grasp.

Although no such award existed at the time, the Helms Foundation later selected a College Basketball Player of the Year for each year dating back to 1905. Steinmetz was named the Player of the Year for 1905. He was the first person selected to receive the Player of the Year award, and 1905 was the first year for which a recipient was selected.

== Later years ==
After graduating, Steinmetz became a lawyer, practicing in Milwaukee for 50 years. He was active in coaching and officiating basketball for several years. For 19 years, Steinmetz selected the All-Western basketball team for Spalding's Official Basketball Guide.

Steinmetz was recognized with multiple honors in his later years. In 1954, he was honored as the "Father of Wisconsin Basketball" at a testimonial dinner at the Milwaukee Athletic Club. At the time, Milwaukee Sentinel sports editor said, "we are honoring one of the great guys in the history of Milwaukee, Wisconsin and the South Side."

He was inducted into the Helms Foundation Hall of Fame in 1957, the Wisconsin Athletic Hall of Fame in 1958, and the Basketball Hall of Fame in 1961. At the induction into the Wisconsin Athletic Hall of Fame, Steinmetz quipped, "I won't have to talk about my records. Modesty forbids. They speak for themselves." He also joked about having been overlooked in prior years: "I'd been waiting for it since the first election of the board. The hardest thing I had to do was sit there and wait to be called."

Steinmetz married Bessie Engel in November 1908. They had three sons, Christian, Allan and Don, and one daughter, Ruth. All three sons played varsity basketball for the University of Wisconsin, and all three became lawyers. At the time of his induction into the Helms Foundation's Basketball Hall of Fame, Steinmetz said that he was proudest of the fact that "I had three sons who won basketball letters at Wisconsin. When we're all home that makes four of us at the table and you don't find many tables like that."

Steinmetz suffered a stroke in 1962 and a second stroke in 1963. He died at St. Luke's Hospital in Milwaukee three weeks after the second stroke at age 80.
