= 1904–05 Indiana Hoosiers men's basketball team =

American college basketball season

1904–05 Indiana Hoosiers men's basketball
- Conference: Big Ten Conference
- Record: 5–12 (1–1 Western)
- Head coach: Zora Clevenger (1st season)
- Captain: Earl Taber
- Home arena: Old Assembly Hall

1904–05 Western Conference men's basketball standings
	Conf.				Overall
Team	W		L	PCT	W		L	PCT
Chicago†	5	–	2	.714	9	–	3	.750
Wisconsin	1	–	0	1.000	10	–	8	.556
Minnesota	3	–	1	.750	7	–	7	.500
Northwestern	1	–	2	.333	2	–	2	.500
Iowa	0	–	3	.000	6	–	8	.429
Purdue	1	–	3	.250	3	–	6	.333
Indiana	1	–	1	.500	5	–	12	.294
† Intramural play only, the conference did not have an official champion winner

The 1904–05 Indiana Hoosiers men's basketball team represented Indiana University. Their head coach was Zora Clevenger, who was in his first year. The team played its home games at the Old Assembly Hall in Bloomington, Indiana, and was a first-time member of the Western Conference.

The Hoosiers finished the regular season with an overall record of 5–12 and a conference record of 1–1.

== Roster ==
Name	Position	Year	Hometown
Charles Carr	F	Sr.	Anderson, Indiana
Thomas Cookson	F	Sr.	Anderson, Indiana
Chester Harmeson	F	Jr.	Anderson, Indiana
Cassius Hiatt	G	Jr.	Kirklin, Indiana
Ralph Noel	G	Sr.	Star City, Indiana
Godfred Ritterskamp	F	Jr.	Freelandsville, Indiana
Bernard Robinson	F	N/A	Marshall, Illinois
James Sanders	G	So.	Jasonville, Indiana
Earl Taber	G	Sr.	Marion, Indiana
George Teter	C	Sr.	Sheridan, Indiana
George Trimble	G	Fr.	Evansville, Indiana
Clifford Woody	F	So.	Thorntown, Indiana

== Schedule/results ==
Date time, TV	Rank^{#}	Opponent^{#}	Result	Record	Site city, state
Regular season
12/13/1904*		at Indianapolis YMCA	L 19–32	0–1	Indianapolis, IN
1/7/1905*		Rose Poly	L 14–30	0–2	Old Assembly Hall; Bloomington, IN
1/11/1905*		Indiana State	W 52–16	1–2	Old Assembly Hall; Bloomington, IN
1/14/1905		at Purdue; Rivalry	L 20–38	1–3 (0–1)	Lafayette Coliseum; West Lafayette, IN
1/20/1905*		at Wabash	L 17–39	1–4 (0–1)	Crawfordsville, IN
1/26/1905*		Butler	W 41–23	2–4 (0–1)	Old Assembly Hall; Bloomington, IN
2/3/1905*		at Indiana State	L 23–26	2–5 (0–1)	North Hall; Terre Haute, IN
2/4/1905*		at Rose Poly	L 29–39	2–6 (0–1)	Terre Haute, IN
2/11/1905*		Wabash	L 24–31	2–7 (0–1)	Old Assembly Hall; Bloomington, IN
2/18/1905		Purdue; Rivalry	W 29–14	3–7 (1–1)	Old Assembly Hall; Bloomington, IN
2/25/1905*		at Butler	L 29–44	3–8 (1–1)	Indianapolis, IN
2/27/1905*		at Allegheny	L 17–39	3–9 (1–1)	
2/28/1905*		at Hiram (OH)	L 18–49	3–10 (1–1)	Hiram, OH
3/1/1905*		at Rayen Athletic Club	W 34–20	4–10 (1–1)	
3/2/1905*		at Buhl Athletic Club	W 34–21	5–10 (1–1)	
3/3/1905*		at Buchtel	L 24–48	5–11 (1–1)	Akron, OH
3/4/1905*		at Ohio State	L 12–66	5–12 (1–1)	Columbus, OH
*Non-conference game. ^{#}Rankings from AP Poll. (#) Tournament seedings in parentheses.
