= 1904–05 Wisconsin Badgers men's basketball team =

American college basketball season

1904–05 Wisconsin Badgers men's basketball
- Conference: Big Ten Conference
- Record: 10–8 (1–0 Western)
- Head coach: Emmett Angell
- Home arena: Red Gym

1904–05 Western Conference men's basketball standings
| | Conf. | | | | Overall |
| Team | W | | L | PCT | W | | L | PCT |
|---|---|---|---|---|---|---|---|---|
| Chicago† | 5 | – | 2 | .714 | 9 | – | 3 | .750 |
| Wisconsin | 1 | – | 0 | 1.000 | 10 | – | 8 | .556 |
| Minnesota | 3 | – | 1 | .750 | 7 | – | 7 | .500 |
| Northwestern | 1 | – | 2 | .333 | 2 | – | 2 | .500 |
| Iowa | 0 | – | 3 | .000 | 6 | – | 8 | .429 |
| Purdue | 1 | – | 3 | .250 | 3 | – | 6 | .333 |
| Indiana | 1 | – | 1 | .500 | 5 | – | 12 | .294 |
† Intramural play only, the conference did not have an official champion winner

The 1904–05 Wisconsin Badgers men's basketball team represented University of Wisconsin–Madison. The head coach was Emmett Angell, coaching his first season with the Badgers. The team played their home games at the Red Gym in Madison, Wisconsin and was a member of the Western Conference.

== Schedule ==
| Date time, TV | Rank^{#} | Opponent^{#} | Result | Record | Site city, state |
Regular Season
| 12/02/1904* | | at Co. G Sparta | W 75–10 | 1–0 | Sparta, WI |
| 12/03/1904* | | at La Crosse (WI) | W 54–16 | 2–0 | La Crosse, WI |
| 12/27/1904* | | at Sheboygan | W 45–28 | 3–0 | Sheboygan, WI |
| 12/28/1904* | | at Co. G Appleton | W 26–12 | 4–0 | Appleton, WI |
| 12/29/1904* | | at Co. F Oconto | W 55–17 | 5–0 | Oconto, WI |
| 12/30/1904* | | at Two Rivers AC | L 30–31 | 5–1 | Two Rivers, WI |
| 1/07/1905* | | Beloit (WI) | W 80–10 | 6–1 | Red Gym; Madison, WI |
| 1/12/1905* | | at Ohio State | L 22–25 | 6–2 | Columbus, OH |
| 2/13/1905* | | at Rochester | W 26–17 | 7–2 | Rochester, MN |
| 1/14/1905* | | at Washington Continentals | L 22–26 | 7–3 | Unknown |
| 1/16/1905* | | at Co. E New York | L 27–34 | 7–4 | New York City, NY |
| 1/17/1905* | | at Columbia | L 15–21 | 7–5 | New York City, NY |
| 1/18/1905* | | at Institute AC | L 20–34 | 7–6 | Unknown |
| 1/19/1905* | | at Sharon AC | W 41–31 | 8–6 | Unknown |
| 1/20/1905* | | at Buckland Guards | L 31–34 | 8–7 | Buckland, MA |
| 1/21/1905* | | at Oberlin | L 31–41 | 8–8 | Oberlin, OH |
| 3/03/1905* | | at Co. F Portage | W 52–28 | 9–8 | Portage, WI |
| 3/17/1905* | | at Chicago | W 29–24 | 10–8 (1–1) | Chicago, IL |
*Non-conference game. ^{#}Rankings from AP Poll. (#) Tournament seedings in parentheses.
