= Clarence B. Jamison =

American football, basketball, and track and field coach

Clarence Jamison
Biographical details
- Born: 1857; Lafayette, Indiana, U.S.
- Died: Unknown

Coaching career (HC unless noted)

Football
- 1905: Rose Polytechnic

Basketball
- 1905–1906: Rose Polytechnic
- 1906–1908: Purdue

Track
- 1907–1908: Purdue

Clarence B. Jamison (born 1857) was an American football, basketball, and track and field coach. He led the Purdue University men's basketball team from 1906 to 1908. He previously served as the head football coach and basketball coach at Rose-Hulman Institute of Technology in Terre Haute, Indiana.

== Head coaching record ==
=== Football ===
Year	Team	Overall	Conference	Standing	Bowl/playoffs
Rose Polytechnic Fightin' Engineers (Independent) (1905)
1905	Rose Polytechnic	7–2–1			
Rose Polytechnic:		7–2–1			
Total:		7–2–1			

=== Basketball ===
Record table
Season	Team	Overall	Conference	Standing	Postseason
Purdue Boilermakers (Western Conference) (1905–1908)
1905–06	Purdue	4–7	3–6	6th	
1906–07	Purdue	7–8	2–6	4th	
1907–08	Purdue	5–9	0–8	5th	
Purdue:		16–24 (.400)	5–20 (.200)		
Total:		16–24 (.400)			
