= 1904–05 Connecticut Aggies men's basketball team =

American college basketball season

1904–05 Connecticut Aggies men's basketball
- Conference: Athletic League of New England State Colleges
- Record: 3–3 (0–1 ALNESC)

The 1904–05 Connecticut Aggies men's basketball team represented Connecticut Agricultural College, now the University of Connecticut, in the 1904–05 collegiate men's basketball season. The Aggies completed the season with a 3–3 overall record. The Aggies were members of the Athletic League of New England State Colleges and ended the season with a 0–1 record with a loss to Massachusetts.

== Schedule ==
Date time, TV	Rank^{#}	Opponent^{#}	Result	Record	Site (attendance) city, state
Regular Season
*		Stafford High School	W 67–7	1–0	
*		Delphi Club (Willimantic)	L 16–25	1–1	
*		Hartford High School	W 77–34	2–1	
*		Alumni	W 52–38	3–1	
		Massachusetts	L 22–66	3–2 (0–1)	
*		Middletown High School	L 22–58	3–3	
*Non-conference game. ^{#}Rankings from AP Poll. (#) Tournament seedings in parentheses. All times are in Eastern Time.

Schedule Source:
