= 1903–04 collegiate men's basketball season in the United States =

American college basketball season

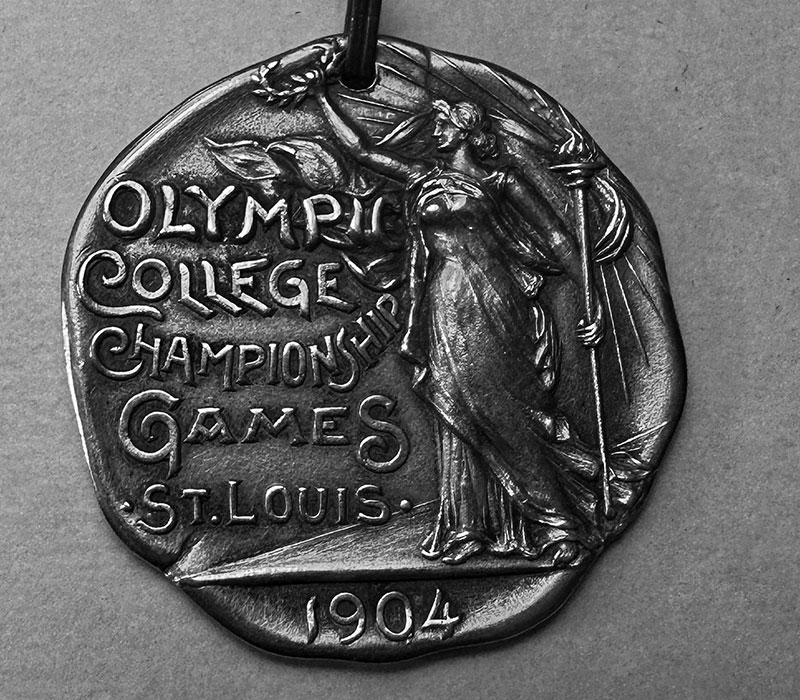
- Gold medal won by Hiram College at the 1904 Olympic Games in St. Louis.
- Helms National Champions: Columbia (retroactive selection in 1943)

The 1903–04 collegiate men's basketball season in the United States began in December 1903, progressed through the regular season, and concluded in March 1904.

== Season headlines ==
- Minnesota (10–2) offered to play the eastern champion, Columbia (17–1), in a three-game post-season playoff series to decide the national championship, but Columbia refused.
- The 1904 Olympic Games in St. Louis, Missouri, held an "Olympic World's College Basket Ball Championship" in July 1904 as part of its basketball competition. Hiram College won, becoming the only American collegiate basketball team to win an Olympic gold medal. Based on the Olympic results, Hiram claimed to have won the mythical national championship of the 1903–04 season.
- In February 1943, the Helms Athletic Foundation retroactively selected Columbia as its national champion for the 1903–04 season.
- In 1995, the Premo-Porretta Power Poll retroactively selected Columbia as its top-ranked team for the 1903–04 season.

== Conference membership changes ==
School	Former Conference	New Conference
Chicago Maroons	No major basketball program	Western Conference
Penn Quakers	Independent	Eastern Intercollegiate Basketball League

== Regular season ==
=== Conference winners ===
Conference	Regular- season winner	Conference Player of the Year	Conference tournament	Tournament venue (city)	Tournament winner
Eastern Intercollegiate Basketball League	Columbia	None selected	No tournament		
Western Conference	None (see note)	None selected	No tournament		

Note: The Western Conference (the future Big Ten Conference) did not sponsor an official conference season or recognize a regular-season champion until the 1905–06 season. In 1903–04, Chicago (7–0) finished with the best winning percentage (1.000) and Purdue (11–2) and Wisconsin (11–4) with the most wins.

1903–04 Eastern Intercollegiate Basketball League standings
	Conf.				Overall
Team	W		L	PCT	W		L	PCT
Columbia	10	–	0	1.000	17	–	1	.944
Penn	6	–	4	.600	10	–	4	.714
Princeton	5	–	5	.500	10	–	5	.667
Yale	5	–	5	.500	10	–	12	.455
Cornell	3	–	7	.300	6	–	13	.316
Harvard	1	–	9	.100	1	–	9	.100

1903–04 Western Conference men's basketball standings
	Conf.				Overall
Team	W		L	PCT	W		L	PCT
Chicago†	0	–	0	–	7	–	0	1.000
Purdue	2	–	1	.667	11	–	2	.846
Minnesota	1	–	0	1.000	10	–	2	.833
Iowa	0	–	0	–	6	–	2	.750
Wisconsin	0	–	0	–	11	–	4	.733
Indiana	0	–	2	.000	5	–	4	.556
† Intramural play only; the conference did not have an official champion winner

=== Independents ===
A total of 56 college teams played as major independents. Among teams that played at least 10 games, North Dakota Agricultural (11–1) had the best winning percentage (.917), and Fordham (19–5) won the most games.

1903–04 collegiate men's basketball independents standings
	Conf.				Overall
Team	W		L	PCT	W		L	PCT
Cumberland (Tenn.)		–		–	4	–	0	1.000
Wisconsin–Stevens Point		–		–	6	–	0	1.000
North Dakota Agricultural		–		–	11	–	1	.917
Illinois State		–		–	7	–	1	.875
Allegheny		–		–	13	–	2	.867
Bloomsburg		–		–	6	–	1	.857
Vanderbilt		–		–	6	–	1	.857
Dayton		–		–	5	–	1	.833
Holy Cross		–		–	10	–	2	.833
Canisius		–		–	9	–	2	.818
Maine		–		–	8	–	2	.800
Fordham		–		–	19	–	5	.792
Hiram		–		–	10	–	3	.769
Denver		–		–	3	–	1	.750
Lehigh		–		–	5	–	2	.714
Ohio State		–		–	10	–	4	.714
Colgate		–		–	12	–	5	.706
Oregon Agricultural		–		–	7	–	3	.700
Williams		–		–	15	–	7	.682
Army		–		–	2	–	1	.667
Connecticut		–		–	6	–	3	.667
Montana State		–		–	4	–	2	.667
Washington		–		–	6	–	3	.667
Washington State		–		–	2	–	1	.667
Grove City		–		–	9	–	5	.643
Nebraska		–		–	9	–	5	.643
Grinnell		–		–	7	–	4	.636
Michigan State		–		–	5	–	3	.625
Baker		–		–	6	–	4	.600
Bucknell		–		–	7	–	5	.583
Syracuse		–		–	11	–	8	.579
Cincinnati		–		–	8	–	6	.571
Colorado		–		–	4	–	3	.571
Dartmouth		–		–	8	–	6	.571
West Virginia		–		–	4	–	3	.571
Penn State		–		–	5	–	4	.556
Wheaton (Ill.)		–		–	10	–	9	.526
Augustana (Ill.)		–		–	1	–	1	.500
Brigham Young		–		–	3	–	3	.500
Butler		–		–	2	–	2	.500
Gettysburg		–		–	4	–	4	.500
Temple		–		–	4	–	4	.500
Utah State		–		–	2	–	2	.500
Mount Union		–		–	4	–	5	.444
Brown		–		–	8	–	11	.421
Kansas		–		–	5	–	8	.385
Wabash		–		–	4	–	7	.364
Wesleyan (Conn.)		–		–	5	–	9	.357
Westminster (Pa.)		–		–	2	–	4	.333
Wooster		–		–	2	–	4	.333
Akron		–		–	3	–	7	.300
Rhode Island A&M		–		–	1	–	3	.250
Kentucky		–		–	1	–	4	.200
Indiana State		–		–	2	–	11	.154
Bradley		–		–	0	–	4	.000
Oregon		–		–	0	–	4	.000

== Post-season tournament ==
The 1903–04 Hiram College basketball team.

=== 1904 Olympic Games college championship ===
The 1904 Olympic Games in St. Louis, Missouri, included basketball as a demonstration sport. One of the seven Olympic basketball competitions was an "Olympic World's College Basket Ball Championship," held in a round-robin format with three schools — Hiram College, Latter-day Saints University (now Ensign College), and Wheaton College — taking part. The competition took place on July 11–12, 1904, and was played outdoors outside Physical Culture Gymnasium (now Francis Gymnasium) at Washington University. Hiram won both of its games, becoming the only American collegiate basketball team to win an Olympic gold medal. Based on this competition, Hiram claimed to have won the mythical national championship for the 1903–04 season. The results were:

- First match: Hiram 25 Wheaton 20
- Second match: Hiram 25 Latter-day Saints 18
- Third match: Wheaton 40 Latter-day Saints 35

== Coaching changes ==
A number of teams changed coaches during the season and after it ended.

Team	Former Coach	Interim Coach	New Coach	Reason
Brown	Paul DeWolf		Henry Ahrens	
Butler	Walter F. Kelly		Ralph Jones	
Fordham	S. J. Mellyn		John McLaughlin	
Iowa	Fred W. Bailey		Ed Rule	
Michigan State	George Denman		Chester Brewer	
Oregon Agricultural	J. W. Viggers		W. O. Trine	
Purdue	C. I. Freeman		John Snack	
Princeton	Bill Roper		William McCoy	
Vanderbilt	Grinnell Jones		Ed Hamilton	
