= List of Seton Hall Pirates men's basketball seasons =

This is a list of seasons completed by the Seton Hall Pirates men's college basketball team.

== Seasons ==
Statistics overview
Season	Coach	Overall	Conference	Standing	Postseason
No coach (Independent) (1903–1904)
1903-04	No coach	2–3–1			
William Caffrey (Independent) (1908–1909)
1908-09	William Caffrey	10–4			
Dick McDonough (Independent) (1909–1910)
1909-10	Dick McDonough	6–2			
Jim Flanagan (Independent) (1910–1911)
1910-11	Jim Flanagan	4–0			
Frank Hill (Independent) (1911–1930)
1911-12	Frank Hill	9–6			
1912-13	Frank Hill	11–3			
1913-14	Frank Hill	14–3–1			
1914–15	Frank Hill	15–2			
1915–16	Frank Hill	13–2			
1916–17	Frank Hill	12–3			
1917–18	Frank Hill	8–5			
1918–19	Frank Hill	8–5			
1919–20	Frank Hill	10–3			
1920–21	Frank Hill	13–4			
1921–22	Frank Hill	14–2			
1922–23	Frank Hill	8–4			
1923–24	Frank Hill	6–7			
1924–25	Frank Hill	8–6			
1925–26	Frank Hill	7–5			
1926–27	Frank Hill	10–3			
1927–28	Frank Hill	9–4			
1928–29	Frank Hill	11–4			
1929–30	Frank Hill	13–9			
Frank Hill:		192–75 (.719)			
Dan Steinberg (Independent) (1930–1931)
1930–31	Dan Steinberg	12–11			
Dan Steinberg:		12–11 (.522)			
Les Fries (Independent) (1931–1933)
1931–32	Les Fries	10–9			
1932–33	Les Fries	8–4			
Les Fries:		18–13 (.581)			
John Colrick (Independent) (1934–1936)
1934–35	John Colrick	4–11			
1935–36	John Colrick	4–11			
John Colrick:		8–22 (.267)			
John "Honey" Russell (Independent) (1936–1943)
1936–37	Honey Russell	5–10			
1937–38	Honey Russell	10–8			
1938–39	Honey Russell	15–7			
1939–40	Honey Russell	19–0			
1940–41	Honey Russell	20–2			NIT Fourth Place
1941–42	Honey Russell	16–3			
1942–43	Honey Russell	16–2			
Bob Davies (Independent) (1946–1947)
1946–47	Bob Davies	24–3			
Bob Davies:		24–3 (.889)			
Jack Reitemeier (Independent) (1947–1949)
1947–48	Jack Reitemeier	18–4			
1948–49	Jack Reitemeier	16–8			
Jack Reitemeier:		34–12 (.739)			
John "Honey" Russell (Independent) (1949–1960)
1949–50	Honey Russell	11–15			
1950–51	Honey Russell	24–7			NIT Fourth Place
1951–52	Honey Russell	25–3			NIT first round
1952–53	Honey Russell	31–2			NIT Champion
1953–54	Honey Russell	13–10			
1954–55	Honey Russell	17–9			NIT first round
1955–56	Honey Russell	20–5			NIT Quarterfinal
1956–57	Honey Russell	17–10			NIT first round
1957–58	Honey Russell	7–19			
1958–59	Honey Russell	13–10			
1959–60	Honey Russell	16–7			
Honey Russell:		295–129 (.696)			
Richard Regan (Independent) (1960–1965)
1960–61	Richard Regan	15–9			
1961–62	Richard Regan	15–9			
1962–63	Richard Regan	16–7			
1963–64	Richard Regan	13–12			
1964–65	Richard Regan	12–13			
Richard Regan (Metropolitan Collegiate Conference) (1965–1969)
1965–66	Richard Regan	6–18	3–6	7th	
1966–67	Richard Regan	7–17	3–6	7th	
1967–68	Richard Regan	9–15	4–4	4th	
1968–69	Richard Regan	9–16	4–4	4th	
Richard Regan (Independent) (1969–1970)
1969–70	Richard Regan	10–15			
Richard Regan:		112–131 (.461)			
Bill Raftery (Independent) (1970–1976)
1970–71	Bill Raftery	11–15			
1971–72	Bill Raftery	10–16			
1972–73	Bill Raftery	8–17			
1973–74	Bill Raftery	16–11			NIT first round
1974–75	Bill Raftery	16–11			
1975–76	Bill Raftery	18–9			
Bill Raftery (New Jersey-New York 7 Conference) (1976–1979)
1976–77	Bill Raftery	18–11	3–1	T–1st	NIT first round
1977–78	Bill Raftery	16–11	1–5	6th	
1978–79	Bill Raftery	14–13	5–1	2nd	
Bill Raftery (Big East Conference) (1979–1981)
1979–80	Bill Raftery	14–13	1–5	6th	
1980–81	Bill Raftery	11–16	4–10	7th	
Bill Raftery:		154–141 (.522)	14–22 (.250)		
Hoddy Mahon (Big East Conference) (1981–1982)
1981–82	Hoddy Mahon	11–16	2–12	8th	
Hoddy Mahon:		11–16 (.407)	2–12 (.143)		
P.J. Carlesimo (Big East Conference) (1982–1994)
1982–83	P.J. Carlesimo	6–23	1–15	9th	
1983–84	P.J. Carlesimo	9–19	2–14	9th	
1984–85	P.J. Carlesimo	10–18	1–15	9th	
1985–86	P.J. Carlesimo	14–18	3–13	9th	
1986–87	P.J. Carlesimo	15–14	4–12	7th	NIT first round
1987-88	P.J. Carlesimo	22–13	8–8	6th	NCAA Division I second round
1988-89	P.J. Carlesimo	31–7	11–5	2nd	NCAA Division I Runner-up
1989–90	P.J. Carlesimo	12–16	5–11	7th	
1990-91	P.J. Carlesimo	25–9	9–7	T–3rd	NCAA Division I Elite Eight
1991-92	P.J. Carlesimo	23–9	12–6	T–1st	NCAA Division I Sweet Sixteen
1992-93	P.J. Carlesimo	28–7	14–4	1st	NCAA Division I second round
1993-94	P.J. Carlesimo	17–13	8–10	7th	NCAA Division I first round
P.J. Carlesimo:		212–166 (.561)	72–109 (.398)		
George Blaney (Big East Conference) (1994–1997)
1994-95	George Blaney	16–14	7–11	7th	NIT first round
1995-96	George Blaney	12–16	7–11	5th (BE7)	
1996-97	George Blaney	10–18	5–13	6th (BE7)	
George Blaney:		38–48 (.442)	19–35 (.352)		
Tommy Amaker (Big East Conference) (1997–2001)
1997-98	Tommy Amaker	15–15	9–9	3rd (BE7)	NIT first round
1998-99	Tommy Amaker	15–15	8–10	T–8th	NIT first round
1999-00	Tommy Amaker	22–10	10–6	T–4th	NCAA Division I Sweet Sixteen
2000-01	Tommy Amaker	16–15	5–11	6th (West)	NIT first round
Tommy Amaker:		68–55 (.553)	32–36 (.471)		
Louis Orr (Big East Conference) (2001–2006)
2001-02	Louis Orr	12–18	5–11	6th (West)	
2002-03	Louis Orr	17–13	10–6	T–3rd (West)	NIT first round
2003-04	Louis Orr	21–10	10–6	T–5th	NCAA Division I second round
2004-05	Louis Orr	12–16	4–12	T–9th	
2005-06	Louis Orr	18–12	9–7	7th	NCAA Division I first round
Louis Orr:		80–69 (.537)	38–42 (.475)		
Bobby Gonzalez (Big East Conference) (2006–2010)
2006-07	Bobby Gonzalez	13–16	4–12	13th	
2007-08	Bobby Gonzalez	17–15	7–11	11th	
2008-09	Bobby Gonzalez	17–15	7–11	11th	
2009-10	Bobby Gonzalez	19–13	9–9	10th	NIT first round
Bobby Gonzalez:		66–59 (.528)	27–43 (.386)		
Kevin Willard (Big East Conference) (2010–2022)
2010-11	Kevin Willard	13–18	7–11	12th	
2011–12	Kevin Willard	21–13	8–10	10th	NIT second round
2012–13	Kevin Willard	15–18	3–15	T–13th	
2013–14	Kevin Willard	17–17	6–12	8th	
2014–15	Kevin Willard	16–15	6–12	T–7th	
2015–16	Kevin Willard	25–9	12–6	3rd	NCAA Division I first round
2016–17	Kevin Willard	21–12	10–8	5th	NCAA Division I first round
2017–18	Kevin Willard	22–12	10–8	3rd	NCAA Division I second round
2018–19	Kevin Willard	20–14	9–9	3rd	NCAA Division I first round
2019–20	Kevin Willard	21–9	13–5	T–1st	No postseason held
2020–21	Kevin Willard	14–13	10–9	T–4th	
2021–22	Kevin Willard	21–11	11–8	T–5th	NCAA Division I first round
Kevin Willard:		226–161 (.584)	105–113 (.482)		
Shaheen Holloway (Big East Conference) (2022–present)
2022–23	Shaheen Holloway	17–16	10–10	T–6th	NIT first round
2023–24	Shaheen Holloway	25–12	13–7	4th	NIT Champion
2024–25	Shaheen Holloway	7–25	2–18	11th	
2025–26	Shaheen Holloway	21–12	10–10	4th	
Shaheen Holloway:		70–65 (.519)	35–45 (.438)		
Total:		1,641–1,184–2 (.581)			
National champion Postseason invitational champion Conference regular season champion Conference regular season and conference tournament champion Division regular season champion Division regular season and conference tournament champion Conference tournament champion
