= 1903–04 Michigan State Spartans men's basketball team =

American college basketball season

1903–04 Michigan State Spartans men's basketball
- Conference: Independent
- Record: 5–3
- Head coach: Chester Brewer (1st season)
- Captain: Edward Balbach
- Home arena: Armory

1903–04 collegiate men's basketball independents standings
	Conf.				Overall
Team	W		L	PCT	W		L	PCT
Cumberland (Tenn.)		–		–	4	–	0	1.000
Wisconsin–Stevens Point		–		–	6	–	0	1.000
North Dakota Agricultural		–		–	11	–	1	.917
Illinois State		–		–	7	–	1	.875
Allegheny		–		–	13	–	2	.867
Bloomsburg		–		–	6	–	1	.857
Vanderbilt		–		–	6	–	1	.857
Dayton		–		–	5	–	1	.833
Holy Cross		–		–	10	–	2	.833
Canisius		–		–	9	–	2	.818
Maine		–		–	8	–	2	.800
Fordham		–		–	19	–	5	.792
Hiram		–		–	10	–	3	.769
Denver		–		–	3	–	1	.750
Lehigh		–		–	5	–	2	.714
Ohio State		–		–	10	–	4	.714
Colgate		–		–	12	–	5	.706
Oregon Agricultural		–		–	7	–	3	.700
Williams		–		–	15	–	7	.682
Army		–		–	2	–	1	.667
Connecticut		–		–	6	–	3	.667
Montana State		–		–	4	–	2	.667
Washington		–		–	6	–	3	.667
Washington State		–		–	2	–	1	.667
Grove City		–		–	9	–	5	.643
Nebraska		–		–	9	–	5	.643
Grinnell		–		–	7	–	4	.636
Michigan State		–		–	5	–	3	.625
Baker		–		–	6	–	4	.600
Bucknell		–		–	7	–	5	.583
Syracuse		–		–	11	–	8	.579
Cincinnati		–		–	8	–	6	.571
Colorado		–		–	4	–	3	.571
Dartmouth		–		–	8	–	6	.571
West Virginia		–		–	4	–	3	.571
Penn State		–		–	5	–	4	.556
Wheaton (Ill.)		–		–	10	–	9	.526
Augustana (Ill.)		–		–	1	–	1	.500
Brigham Young		–		–	3	–	3	.500
Butler		–		–	2	–	2	.500
Gettysburg		–		–	4	–	4	.500
Temple		–		–	4	–	4	.500
Utah State		–		–	2	–	2	.500
Mount Union		–		–	4	–	5	.444
Brown		–		–	8	–	11	.421
Kansas		–		–	5	–	8	.385
Wabash		–		–	4	–	7	.364
Wesleyan (Conn.)		–		–	5	–	9	.357
Westminster (Pa.)		–		–	2	–	4	.333
Wooster		–		–	2	–	4	.333
Akron		–		–	3	–	7	.300
Rhode Island A&M		–		–	1	–	3	.250
Kentucky		–		–	1	–	4	.200
Indiana State		–		–	2	–	11	.154
Bradley		–		–	0	–	4	.000
Oregon		–		–	0	–	4	.000

The 1903–04 Michigan State Spartans men's basketball team represented Michigan State University for the 1903–04 college men's basketball season. The school was known as State Agricultural College at this time. The head coach was Chester Brewer coaching the team his first season. The team captain was Edward Balbach. The team finished the season with a 5–3 record as an independent.

== Schedule ==
Date time, TV	Opponent	Result	Record	Site city, state
Regular season
Jan 20, 1904*	Chicago West YMCA	L 13–44	0–1	Armory; East Lansing, MI
Jan 23, 1904*	Alma	W 52–7	1–1	Armory; East Lansing, MI
Feb 6, 1904*	at Eastern Michigan	W 22–2	2–1	Gymnasium; Ypsilanti, MI
Feb 12, 1904*	at Grand Rapids YMCA	W 14–13	3–1	
Feb 27, 1904*	at Alma	L 14–22	3–2	
Mar 5, 1904*	Eastern Michigan	W 62–10 or 34-14^{1}	4–2	Armory; East Lansing, MI
Mar 12, 1904*	at Grand Rapids YMCA	W 41–10	5–2	Armory; East Lansing, MI
Mar 25, 1904*	at Detroit A.C.	L 8–33	5–3	
*Non-conference game. (#) Tournament seedings in parentheses.

1. Michigan State Media Guide list score as 62-10, while Eastern Michigan Media Guide list score as 34-14.
