= 1903–04 Indiana State Sycamores men's basketball team =

American college basketball season

1903–04 Indiana State Sycamores men's basketball
- Conference: Independent
- Record: 2–11
- Head coach: John Kimmell (5th season)
- Home arena: North Hall

1903–04 collegiate men's basketball independents standings
	Conf.				Overall
Team	W		L	PCT	W		L	PCT
Cumberland (Tenn.)		–		–	4	–	0	1.000
Wisconsin–Stevens Point		–		–	6	–	0	1.000
North Dakota Agricultural		–		–	11	–	1	.917
Illinois State		–		–	7	–	1	.875
Allegheny		–		–	13	–	2	.867
Bloomsburg		–		–	6	–	1	.857
Vanderbilt		–		–	6	–	1	.857
Dayton		–		–	5	–	1	.833
Holy Cross		–		–	10	–	2	.833
Canisius		–		–	9	–	2	.818
Maine		–		–	8	–	2	.800
Fordham		–		–	19	–	5	.792
Hiram		–		–	10	–	3	.769
Denver		–		–	3	–	1	.750
Lehigh		–		–	5	–	2	.714
Ohio State		–		–	10	–	4	.714
Colgate		–		–	12	–	5	.706
Oregon Agricultural		–		–	7	–	3	.700
Williams		–		–	15	–	7	.682
Army		–		–	2	–	1	.667
Connecticut		–		–	6	–	3	.667
Montana State		–		–	4	–	2	.667
Washington		–		–	6	–	3	.667
Washington State		–		–	2	–	1	.667
Grove City		–		–	9	–	5	.643
Nebraska		–		–	9	–	5	.643
Grinnell		–		–	7	–	4	.636
Michigan State		–		–	5	–	3	.625
Baker		–		–	6	–	4	.600
Bucknell		–		–	7	–	5	.583
Syracuse		–		–	11	–	8	.579
Cincinnati		–		–	8	–	6	.571
Colorado		–		–	4	–	3	.571
Dartmouth		–		–	8	–	6	.571
West Virginia		–		–	4	–	3	.571
Penn State		–		–	5	–	4	.556
Wheaton (Ill.)		–		–	10	–	9	.526
Augustana (Ill.)		–		–	1	–	1	.500
Brigham Young		–		–	3	–	3	.500
Butler		–		–	2	–	2	.500
Gettysburg		–		–	4	–	4	.500
Temple		–		–	4	–	4	.500
Utah State		–		–	2	–	2	.500
Mount Union		–		–	4	–	5	.444
Brown		–		–	8	–	11	.421
Kansas		–		–	5	–	8	.385
Wabash		–		–	4	–	7	.364
Wesleyan (Conn.)		–		–	5	–	9	.357
Westminster (Pa.)		–		–	2	–	4	.333
Wooster		–		–	2	–	4	.333
Akron		–		–	3	–	7	.300
Rhode Island A&M		–		–	1	–	3	.250
Kentucky		–		–	1	–	4	.200
Indiana State		–		–	2	–	11	.154
Bradley		–		–	0	–	4	.000
Oregon		–		–	0	–	4	.000

The 1903–04 Indiana State Sycamores men's basketball team represented Indiana State University during the 1903–04 collegiate men's basketball season. The head coach was John Kimmell, in his fifth season coaching the Sycamores. The team played their home games at North Hall in Terre Haute, Indiana.

== Schedule ==
Date time, TV	Opponent	Result	Record	Site city, state
12/02/1903	Rose Polytechnic	L 12–48	0–1	North Hall; Terre Haute, IN
12/04/1903	Crawfordsville Bus.	L 19–23	0–2	North Hall; Terre Haute, IN
12/12/1903	at YMCA Terre Haute	L 18–30	0–3	
1/08/1904	Terre Haute H.S.	W 34–14	1–3	North Hall; Terre Haute, IN
1/15/1904	at Butler	L 16–28	1–4	Indianapolis, IN
1/23/1904	at DePauw	L 21–38	1–5	Greencastle, IN
1/28/1904	at Wabash	L 19–37	1–6	Crawfordsville, IN
1/29/1904	at Crawfordsville Bus.	L 27–34	1–7	
2/12/1904	Wabash	L 16–30	1–8	North Hall; Terre Haute, IN
2/17/1904	Rose Polytechnic	L 14–52	1–9	North Hall; Terre Haute, IN
2/27/1904	Butler	W 22–14	2–9	North Hall; Terre Haute, IN
3/02/1904	YMCA Terre Haute	L 13–22	2–10	North Hall; Terre Haute, IN
3/12/1904	at DePauw	L 27–29	2–11	Greencastle, IN
*Non-conference game. (#) Tournament seedings in parentheses.
