= 1903–04 Holy Cross Crusaders men's basketball team =

American college basketball season

1903–04 Holy Cross Crusaders men's basketball
- Conference: Independent
- Record: 10–2
- Head coach: J. Fred Powers (3rd season)
- Captain: John M. Reed
- Home arena: N/A

1903–04 collegiate men's basketball independents standings
	Conf.				Overall
Team	W		L	PCT	W		L	PCT
Cumberland (Tenn.)		–		–	4	–	0	1.000
Wisconsin–Stevens Point		–		–	6	–	0	1.000
North Dakota Agricultural		–		–	11	–	1	.917
Illinois State		–		–	7	–	1	.875
Allegheny		–		–	13	–	2	.867
Bloomsburg		–		–	6	–	1	.857
Vanderbilt		–		–	6	–	1	.857
Dayton		–		–	5	–	1	.833
Holy Cross		–		–	10	–	2	.833
Canisius		–		–	9	–	2	.818
Maine		–		–	8	–	2	.800
Fordham		–		–	19	–	5	.792
Hiram		–		–	10	–	3	.769
Denver		–		–	3	–	1	.750
Lehigh		–		–	5	–	2	.714
Ohio State		–		–	10	–	4	.714
Colgate		–		–	12	–	5	.706
Oregon Agricultural		–		–	7	–	3	.700
Williams		–		–	15	–	7	.682
Army		–		–	2	–	1	.667
Connecticut		–		–	6	–	3	.667
Montana State		–		–	4	–	2	.667
Washington		–		–	6	–	3	.667
Washington State		–		–	2	–	1	.667
Grove City		–		–	9	–	5	.643
Nebraska		–		–	9	–	5	.643
Grinnell		–		–	7	–	4	.636
Michigan State		–		–	5	–	3	.625
Baker		–		–	6	–	4	.600
Bucknell		–		–	7	–	5	.583
Syracuse		–		–	11	–	8	.579
Cincinnati		–		–	8	–	6	.571
Colorado		–		–	4	–	3	.571
Dartmouth		–		–	8	–	6	.571
West Virginia		–		–	4	–	3	.571
Penn State		–		–	5	–	4	.556
Wheaton (Ill.)		–		–	10	–	9	.526
Augustana (Ill.)		–		–	1	–	1	.500
Brigham Young		–		–	3	–	3	.500
Butler		–		–	2	–	2	.500
Gettysburg		–		–	4	–	4	.500
Temple		–		–	4	–	4	.500
Utah State		–		–	2	–	2	.500
Mount Union		–		–	4	–	5	.444
Brown		–		–	8	–	11	.421
Kansas		–		–	5	–	8	.385
Wabash		–		–	4	–	7	.364
Wesleyan (Conn.)		–		–	5	–	9	.357
Westminster (Pa.)		–		–	2	–	4	.333
Wooster		–		–	2	–	4	.333
Akron		–		–	3	–	7	.300
Rhode Island A&M		–		–	1	–	3	.250
Kentucky		–		–	1	–	4	.200
Indiana State		–		–	2	–	11	.154
Bradley		–		–	0	–	4	.000
Oregon		–		–	0	–	4	.000

The 1903–04 Holy Cross Crusaders men's basketball team represented The College of the Holy Cross during the 1903–04 college men's basketball season. The head coach was J. Fred Powers, coaching the Crusaders in his third season.

== Schedule ==
Date time, TV	Opponent	Result	Record	Site city, state
12/12/1903*	M.I.T.	L 12–16	0–1	Worcester, MA
12/19/1903*	Worcester Tech	W 16–10	1–1	Worcester, MA
1/12/1904*	Boston University	W 31–04	2–1	Worcester, MA
1/20/1904*	at Brown	W 11–7	3–1	Providence, RI
1/23/1904*	Amherst	W 49–20	4–1	Worcester, MA
1/26/1904*	at Williston	L 12–26	4–2	
1/30/1904*	Harvard	W 18–14	5–2	Worcester, MA
2/06/1904*	Yale	W 20–11	6–2	Worcester, MA
2/13/1904*	Brown	W 20–8	7–2	Worcester, MA
2/20/1904*	at Amherst	W 27–15	8–2	Amherst, MA
3/05/1904*	Worcester Tech	W 17–9	9–2	Worcester, MA
3/10/1904*	Dartmouth	W 9–6	10–2	Worcester, MA
*Non-conference game. (#) Tournament seedings in parentheses.
