= 1903–04 Colgate men's basketball team =

American college basketball season

1903–04 Colgate Raiders men's basketball
- Conference: Independent
- Record: 12–5
- Head coach: Ellery Huntington, Sr. (4th season)
- Captain: Gorham Brigham
- Home arena: none

1903–04 collegiate men's basketball independents standings
| | Conf. | | | | Overall |
| Team | W | | L | PCT | W | | L | PCT |
|---|---|---|---|---|---|---|---|---|
| Cumberland (Tenn.) | | – | | – | 4 | – | 0 | 1.000 |
| Wisconsin–Stevens Point | | – | | – | 6 | – | 0 | 1.000 |
| North Dakota Agricultural | | – | | – | 11 | – | 1 | .917 |
| Illinois State | | – | | – | 7 | – | 1 | .875 |
| Allegheny | | – | | – | 13 | – | 2 | .867 |
| Bloomsburg | | – | | – | 6 | – | 1 | .857 |
| Vanderbilt | | – | | – | 6 | – | 1 | .857 |
| Dayton | | – | | – | 5 | – | 1 | .833 |
| Holy Cross | | – | | – | 10 | – | 2 | .833 |
| Canisius | | – | | – | 9 | – | 2 | .818 |
| Maine | | – | | – | 8 | – | 2 | .800 |
| Fordham | | – | | – | 19 | – | 5 | .792 |
| Hiram | | – | | – | 10 | – | 3 | .769 |
| Denver | | – | | – | 3 | – | 1 | .750 |
| Lehigh | | – | | – | 5 | – | 2 | .714 |
| Ohio State | | – | | – | 10 | – | 4 | .714 |
| Colgate | | – | | – | 12 | – | 5 | .706 |
| Oregon Agricultural | | – | | – | 7 | – | 3 | .700 |
| Williams | | – | | – | 15 | – | 7 | .682 |
| Army | | – | | – | 2 | – | 1 | .667 |
| Connecticut | | – | | – | 6 | – | 3 | .667 |
| Montana State | | – | | – | 4 | – | 2 | .667 |
| Washington | | – | | – | 6 | – | 3 | .667 |
| Washington State | | – | | – | 2 | – | 1 | .667 |
| Grove City | | – | | – | 9 | – | 5 | .643 |
| Nebraska | | – | | – | 9 | – | 5 | .643 |
| Grinnell | | – | | – | 7 | – | 4 | .636 |
| Michigan State | | – | | – | 5 | – | 3 | .625 |
| Baker | | – | | – | 6 | – | 4 | .600 |
| Bucknell | | – | | – | 7 | – | 5 | .583 |
| Syracuse | | – | | – | 11 | – | 8 | .579 |
| Cincinnati | | – | | – | 8 | – | 6 | .571 |
| Colorado | | – | | – | 4 | – | 3 | .571 |
| Dartmouth | | – | | – | 8 | – | 6 | .571 |
| West Virginia | | – | | – | 4 | – | 3 | .571 |
| Penn State | | – | | – | 5 | – | 4 | .556 |
| Wheaton (Ill.) | | – | | – | 10 | – | 9 | .526 |
| Augustana (Ill.) | | – | | – | 1 | – | 1 | .500 |
| Brigham Young | | – | | – | 3 | – | 3 | .500 |
| Butler | | – | | – | 2 | – | 2 | .500 |
| Gettysburg | | – | | – | 4 | – | 4 | .500 |
| Temple | | – | | – | 4 | – | 4 | .500 |
| Utah State | | – | | – | 2 | – | 2 | .500 |
| Mount Union | | – | | – | 4 | – | 5 | .444 |
| Brown | | – | | – | 8 | – | 11 | .421 |
| Kansas | | – | | – | 5 | – | 8 | .385 |
| Wabash | | – | | – | 4 | – | 7 | .364 |
| Wesleyan (Conn.) | | – | | – | 5 | – | 9 | .357 |
| Westminster (Pa.) | | – | | – | 2 | – | 4 | .333 |
| Wooster | | – | | – | 2 | – | 4 | .333 |
| Akron | | – | | – | 3 | – | 7 | .300 |
| Rhode Island A&M | | – | | – | 1 | – | 3 | .250 |
| Kentucky | | – | | – | 1 | – | 4 | .200 |
| Indiana State | | – | | – | 2 | – | 11 | .154 |
| Bradley | | – | | – | 0 | – | 4 | .000 |
| Oregon | | – | | – | 0 | – | 4 | .000 |

The 1903–04 Colgate Raiders men's basketball team represented Colgate University during the 1903–04 college men's basketball season. The head coach was Ellery Huntington Sr. coaching the Raiders in his fourth season. The team finished with an overall record of 12–5.

== Schedule ==
| Date time, TV | Opponent | Result | Record | Site city, state |
|---|---|---|---|---|
| * | Little Falls A.A. | W 42–24 | 1–0 | Hamilton, NY |
| * | at Washington Continentals | W 17–12 | 2–0 | |
| * | at Williams | L 16–18 | 2–1 | Williamstown, MA |
| * | at Amherst | L 30–37 | 2–2 | Amherst, MA |
| * | at Trinity | W 23–10 | 3–2 | Hartford, CT |
| * | at Wesleyan | L 15–17 | 3–3 | Middletown, CT |
| * | at R.P.I. | W 28–09 | 4–3 | |
| * | Hamilton | W 46–06 | 5–3 | Hamilton, NY |
| 1/30/1904* | at Syracuse | L 10–18 | 5–4 | Syracuse, NY |
| * | Utica Free Academy | W 28–20 | 6–4 | Hamilton, NY |
| * | Keuka | W 54–08 | 7–4 | Hamilton, NY |
| * | at St. Lawrence | W 14–10 | 8–4 | Canton, NY |
| * | at Buffalo German YMCA | L 17–31 | 8–5 | |
| * | St. Lawrence | W 24–13 | 9–5 | Hamilton, NY |
| * | at Washington Continentals | W 16–11 | 10–5 | |
| * | at Hamilton | W 21–08 | 11–5 | |
| * | Syracuse | W 24–12 | 12–5 | Hamilton, NY |
*Non-conference game. (#) Tournament seedings in parentheses.
