= 1903–04 Bucknell Bison men's basketball team =

American college basketball season

1903–04 Bucknell Bison men's basketball
- Conference: Independent
- Record: 7–5
- Head coach: Student coaches
- Captain: Pat Cheeseman
- Home arena: none

1903–04 collegiate men's basketball independents standings
	Conf.				Overall
Team	W		L	PCT	W		L	PCT
Cumberland (Tenn.)		–		–	4	–	0	1.000
Wisconsin–Stevens Point		–		–	6	–	0	1.000
North Dakota Agricultural		–		–	11	–	1	.917
Illinois State		–		–	7	–	1	.875
Allegheny		–		–	13	–	2	.867
Bloomsburg		–		–	6	–	1	.857
Vanderbilt		–		–	6	–	1	.857
Dayton		–		–	5	–	1	.833
Holy Cross		–		–	10	–	2	.833
Canisius		–		–	9	–	2	.818
Maine		–		–	8	–	2	.800
Fordham		–		–	19	–	5	.792
Hiram		–		–	10	–	3	.769
Denver		–		–	3	–	1	.750
Lehigh		–		–	5	–	2	.714
Ohio State		–		–	10	–	4	.714
Colgate		–		–	12	–	5	.706
Oregon Agricultural		–		–	7	–	3	.700
Williams		–		–	15	–	7	.682
Army		–		–	2	–	1	.667
Connecticut		–		–	6	–	3	.667
Montana State		–		–	4	–	2	.667
Washington		–		–	6	–	3	.667
Washington State		–		–	2	–	1	.667
Grove City		–		–	9	–	5	.643
Nebraska		–		–	9	–	5	.643
Grinnell		–		–	7	–	4	.636
Michigan State		–		–	5	–	3	.625
Baker		–		–	6	–	4	.600
Bucknell		–		–	7	–	5	.583
Syracuse		–		–	11	–	8	.579
Cincinnati		–		–	8	–	6	.571
Colorado		–		–	4	–	3	.571
Dartmouth		–		–	8	–	6	.571
West Virginia		–		–	4	–	3	.571
Penn State		–		–	5	–	4	.556
Wheaton (Ill.)		–		–	10	–	9	.526
Augustana (Ill.)		–		–	1	–	1	.500
Brigham Young		–		–	3	–	3	.500
Butler		–		–	2	–	2	.500
Gettysburg		–		–	4	–	4	.500
Temple		–		–	4	–	4	.500
Utah State		–		–	2	–	2	.500
Mount Union		–		–	4	–	5	.444
Brown		–		–	8	–	11	.421
Kansas		–		–	5	–	8	.385
Wabash		–		–	4	–	7	.364
Wesleyan (Conn.)		–		–	5	–	9	.357
Westminster (Pa.)		–		–	2	–	4	.333
Wooster		–		–	2	–	4	.333
Akron		–		–	3	–	7	.300
Rhode Island A&M		–		–	1	–	3	.250
Kentucky		–		–	1	–	4	.200
Indiana State		–		–	2	–	11	.154
Bradley		–		–	0	–	4	.000
Oregon		–		–	0	–	4	.000

The 1903–04 Bucknell Bison men's basketball team represented Bucknell University during the 1903–04 college men's basketball season. The Bisons' team captain was Pat Cheeseman.

== Schedule ==
Date time, TV	Opponent	Result	Record	Site city, state
1/15/1904*	Swarthmore	W 33–13	1–0	Lewisburg, PA
1/29/1904*	Scranton	W 37–14	2–0	Lewisburg, PA
2/6/1904*	LaSalle	W 37–14	3–0	Lewisburg, PA
2/10/1904*	Shenandoah	W 62–6	4–0	Lewisburg, PA
2/19/1904*	Gettysburg	W 31–24	5–0	Lewisburg, PA
2/24/1904*	Allegheny	L 10–12	5–1	Lewisburg, PA
3/3/1904*	Williamsport	L 13–14	5–2	Lewisburg, PA
3/5/1904*	at F&M	W 18–3	6–2	
3/7/1904*	Williamsport	L 10–15	6–3	Lewisburg, PA
3/17/1904*	Wilkes-Barre	W 15–11	7–3	Lewisburg, PA
3/25/1904*	at Plymouth	L 7–18	7–4	
3/26/1904*	at Wilkes-Barre	L 10–26	7–5	
*Non-conference game. (#) Tournament seedings in parentheses.
