= 1903–04 Kentucky Wildcats men's basketball team =

1903–04 season of University of Kentucky men's basketball team

1903–04 Kentucky Wildcats men's basketball
- Conference: Independent
- Record: 1–4
- Head coach: Claire Saint John (1st season)
- Home arena: State College Gymnasium

1903–04 collegiate men's basketball independents standings
	Conf.				Overall
Team	W		L	PCT	W		L	PCT
Cumberland (Tenn.)		–		–	4	–	0	1.000
Wisconsin–Stevens Point		–		–	6	–	0	1.000
North Dakota Agricultural		–		–	11	–	1	.917
Illinois State		–		–	7	–	1	.875
Allegheny		–		–	13	–	2	.867
Bloomsburg		–		–	6	–	1	.857
Vanderbilt		–		–	6	–	1	.857
Dayton		–		–	5	–	1	.833
Holy Cross		–		–	10	–	2	.833
Canisius		–		–	9	–	2	.818
Maine		–		–	8	–	2	.800
Fordham		–		–	19	–	5	.792
Hiram		–		–	10	–	3	.769
Denver		–		–	3	–	1	.750
Lehigh		–		–	5	–	2	.714
Ohio State		–		–	10	–	4	.714
Colgate		–		–	12	–	5	.706
Oregon Agricultural		–		–	7	–	3	.700
Williams		–		–	15	–	7	.682
Army		–		–	2	–	1	.667
Connecticut		–		–	6	–	3	.667
Montana State		–		–	4	–	2	.667
Washington		–		–	6	–	3	.667
Washington State		–		–	2	–	1	.667
Grove City		–		–	9	–	5	.643
Nebraska		–		–	9	–	5	.643
Grinnell		–		–	7	–	4	.636
Michigan State		–		–	5	–	3	.625
Baker		–		–	6	–	4	.600
Bucknell		–		–	7	–	5	.583
Syracuse		–		–	11	–	8	.579
Cincinnati		–		–	8	–	6	.571
Colorado		–		–	4	–	3	.571
Dartmouth		–		–	8	–	6	.571
West Virginia		–		–	4	–	3	.571
Penn State		–		–	5	–	4	.556
Wheaton (Ill.)		–		–	10	–	9	.526
Augustana (Ill.)		–		–	1	–	1	.500
Brigham Young		–		–	3	–	3	.500
Butler		–		–	2	–	2	.500
Gettysburg		–		–	4	–	4	.500
Temple		–		–	4	–	4	.500
Utah State		–		–	2	–	2	.500
Mount Union		–		–	4	–	5	.444
Brown		–		–	8	–	11	.421
Kansas		–		–	5	–	8	.385
Wabash		–		–	4	–	7	.364
Wesleyan (Conn.)		–		–	5	–	9	.357
Westminster (Pa.)		–		–	2	–	4	.333
Wooster		–		–	2	–	4	.333
Akron		–		–	3	–	7	.300
Rhode Island A&M		–		–	1	–	3	.250
Kentucky		–		–	1	–	4	.200
Indiana State		–		–	2	–	11	.154
Bradley		–		–	0	–	4	.000
Oregon		–		–	0	–	4	.000

The 1903–04 Kentucky State men's basketball team competed on behalf of the University of Kentucky during the 1903–04 season. During the season, Kentucky would continue to struggle under the leadership of senior Claire Saint John. The Wildcats would only win one game against the Cincinnati Bearcats men's basketball and lose all four games to Kentucky University and Georgetown College.

== Roster ==
1904–05 Kentucky Wildcats men's basketball team
Players
Coaches

Pos.	#	Name	Height	Weight	Year	Previous school	Hometown
F		Claire Saint John	—	—	Sr	Unknown	Brooklyn, New York
G		J. White Guyn	—	—	Sr	Unknown	Lexington, Kentucky
F		Henry Wurtele	—	—	Sr	Unknown	Shively, Kentucky
		Harold Moss	—	—	Jr	Paducah High School	Cobb, Kentucky
C		Joe Coons	—	—	Jr	Unknown	Mount Sterling, Kentucky
F		Lee Andrus	—	—	Sr	Unknown	Farmington, Kentucky
G		Richard Arnett	—	—		Woodford County High School	Troy, Kentucky

Head coach

- Claire Saint John

Assistant coach(es)

None

Legend

- (C) Team captain
- (S) Suspended
- (I) Ineligible
- (W) Walk-on
- Injured
- Current redshirt

== Schedule ==
Date time, TV	Rank^{#}	Opponent^{#}	Result	Record	Site city, state
Regular Season
2/4/1904*		Georgetown College	L 11-26	0–1	Georgetown College; Georgetown, KY
2/11/1904*		Kentucky University (now Transylvania)	L 5–12	0–2	Kentucky University; Lexington, KY
2/13/1904*		Georgetown College	L 10–22	0–3	State College Gymnasium; Lexington, KY
2/26/1904*		Kentucky University (now Transylvania)	L 12–14	0–4	Kentucky University; Lexington, KY
3/4/1904*		Cincinnati	W 25–21	1–4	State College Gymnasium; Lexington, KY
*Non-conference game. ^{#}Rankings from AP Poll. (#) Tournament seedings in parentheses.
