= 1903–04 Michigan State Normal Normalites men's basketball team =

American college basketball season

1903–04 Michigan State Normal Normalites men's basketball
- Conference: Independent
- Record: 3–7
- Head coach: Wilbur P. Bowen (1st season)
- Assistant coach: Charles B. Jordan
- Home arena: Gymnasium

The 1903–04 team finished with a record 3–7. It was the first year for head coach Wilbur P. Bowen. Wilbur Bowen became Eastern Michigan's first athletic director in 1903. The team captain was Wilbur Morris and C.B. Jordan was the team manager.

== Roster ==
Number	Name	Position	Class	Hometown
	Albert Graham	Center	Senior	
	Roy Sprague	Forward	Junior	Farmington, MI
	Wilbur Morris	Forward	Senior	
	Edward O'Brien	Guard	Junior	Berrien Center, MI
	Jason Hayward	Guard	Senior	
	W.B. Smith	Guard	Sophomore	Ubly, MI

1904 Michigan Normal College Men's Basketball Team

== Schedule ==
Date time, TV	Rank^{#}	Opponent^{#}	Result	Record	Site (attendance) city, state
Non-conference regular season
January 16, 1904*; Cancelled		Detroit Athletic Club/Detroit YMCA			Gymnasium; Ypsilanti, MI
Exhibition
January 16, 1904*		Normal Reserves			Gymnasium; Ypsilanti, MI
Non-conference regular season
January 28, 1904*		Adrian College	W 27-8	1-0	Gymnasium; Ypsilanti, MI
February 6, 1904*		Michigan State	L 2-22	1-1	Gymnasium; Ypsilanti, MI
February 13, 1904*		at Detroit AC	L 13-38	1-2	DAC Gym; Detroit, MI
February 17, 1904*		Jackson YMCA	W 27-8	2-2	Gymnasium; Ypsilanti, MI
February 19, 1904*		at Adrian College	L 7-15	2-3	Adrian, MI
February 19, 1904*		at Jackson YMCA	L 10-12	2-4	Jackson, MI
February 27, 1904*		Detroit AC	L 14-34	2-5	Gymnasium; Ypsilanti, MI
March 5, 1904*		at Michigan State	L 14-34	2-6	Armory; East Lansing, MI
March 5, 1904*		at Governor's Guard			Armory; East Lansing, MI
Postseason
March 11, 1904*		Detroit Coopers	W 22-18	3-6	Gymnasium; Ypsilanti, MI
March 25, 1904*		at Detroit Coopers	L 13-23	3-7	D.A.C Gym; Detroit, MI
Non-conference regular season
May 9, 1904*		Hillsdale			Gymnasium; Ypsilanti, MI
*Non-conference game. ^{#}Rankings from AP Poll. (#) Tournament seedings in parentheses. All times are in Eastern Time.
