= 1903–04 Columbia Lions men's basketball team =

American college basketball season

1903–04 Columbia Lions men's basketball

EIBL Champions Helms Foundation National Champions
- Conference: Eastern Intercollegiate Basketball League
- Record: 17–1 (10–0 EIBL)
- Head coach: No coach
- Home arena: University Heights Gymnasium

1903–04 Eastern Intercollegiate Basketball League standings
	Conf.				Overall
Team	W		L	PCT	W		L	PCT
Columbia	10	–	0	1.000	17	–	1	.944
Penn	6	–	4	.600	10	–	4	.714
Princeton	5	–	5	.500	10	–	5	.667
Yale	5	–	5	.500	10	–	12	.455
Cornell	3	–	7	.300	6	–	13	.316
Harvard	1	–	9	.100	1	–	9	.100

The 1903–04 Columbia Lions men's basketball team represented Columbia University in intercollegiate basketball during the 1903–04 season. The team finished the season with a 17–1 record, was retroactively named the national champion by the Helms Athletic Foundation, and was retroactively listed as the top team of the season by the Premo-Porretta Power Poll.

== Schedule ==
Date time, TV	Rank^{#}	Opponent^{#}	Result	Record	Site city, state
Regular season
*		at Pratt	W 42–14	1–0	Brooklyn, NY
*		57th Street YMCA	W 29–16	2–0	University Heights Gymnasium; Upper Manhattan, NY
*		Williams	W 16–9	3–0	University Heights Gymnasium; Upper Manhattan, NY
*		at Washington Continentals	L 12–17	3–1	
*		at Second Signal Corporation	W 25–10	4–1	
*		at Norwalk G.F.	W 17–6	5–1	Norwalk, CT
		Harvard	W 39–14	6–1	University Heights Gymnasium; Upper Manhattan, NY
		at Cornell	W 31–18	7–1	Ithaca, NY
*		at Rochester	W 27–13	8–1	Rochester, NY
*		Wesleyan	W 40–12	9–1	University Heights Gymnasium; Upper Manhattan, NY
		Penn	W 17–15	10–1	University Heights Gymnasium; Upper Manhattan, NY
		at Yale	W 16–7	11–1	New Haven, CT
		at Harvard	W 24–16	12–1	Boston, MA
		Yale	W 21–5	13–1	University Heights Gymnasium; Upper Manhattan, NY
		at Princeton	W 23–18	14–1	University Gymnasium; Princeton, NJ
		at Penn	W 23–12	15–1	Philadelphia, PA
		Princeton	W 27–15	16–1	University Heights Gymnasium; Upper Manhattan, NY
		Cornell	W 49–13	17–1	University Heights Gymnasium; Upper Manhattan, NY
*Non-conference game. ^{#}Rankings from AP Poll. (#) Tournament seedings in parentheses.
