= 1903–04 Indiana Hoosiers men's basketball team =

American college basketball season

1903–04 Indiana Hoosiers men's basketball
- Conference: Independent
- Record: 5–4
- Head coach: Willis Koval (2nd season)
- Captain: Leslie Maxwell
- Home arena: Old Assembly Hall

1903–04 Western Conference men's basketball standings
	Conf.				Overall
Team	W		L	PCT	W		L	PCT
Chicago†	0	–	0	–	7	–	0	1.000
Purdue	2	–	1	.667	11	–	2	.846
Minnesota	1	–	0	1.000	10	–	2	.833
Iowa	0	–	0	–	6	–	2	.750
Wisconsin	0	–	0	–	11	–	4	.733
Indiana	0	–	2	.000	5	–	4	.556
† Intramural play only; the conference did not have an official champion winner

The 1903–04 Indiana Hoosiers men's basketball team represented Indiana University. Their head coach was Willis Koval, who was in his 2nd and final year. The team played its home games at the Old Assembly Hall in Bloomington, Indiana.

The Hoosiers finished the regular season with an overall record of 5–4.

== Roster ==
Name	Position	Year	Hometown
Chester Harmeson	F	So.	Anderson, Indiana
Clarence Hocker	F	Jr.	Beaver Dam, Kentucky
Jesse Hubble	G	So.	Francesville, Indiana
Kenneth Kizer	F	Fr.	Poneto, Indiana
Leslie Maxwell	C	So.	Indianapolis, Indiana
Ralph Noel	G	Sr.	Star City, Indiana
Albert Penn	F	So.	Camden, Indiana
Godfred Ritterskamp	F	So.	Freelandsville, Indiana
Earl Taber	G	Jr.	Marion, Indiana
Marvin Wallace	G	Sr.	Milton, Indiana
Clifford Woody	F	Fr.	Thorntown, Indiana

== Schedule ==
Date time, TV	Rank^{#}	Opponent^{#}	Result	Record	Site city, state
Regular season
1/16/1904*		Salem High School	W 60–18	1–0	Old Assembly Hall; Bloomington, IN
1/29/1904*		at DePauw	L 28–38	1–1	Greencastle, IN
1/30/1904*		at Rose Poly	L 18–23	1–2	Terre Haute, IN
2/3/1904*		DePauw	W 33–23	2–2	Old Assembly Hall; Bloomington, IN
2/8/1904*		at Wabash	W 32–25	3–2	Crawfordsville, IN
2/12/1904*		Purdue; Rivalry	L 18–31	3–3	Old Assembly Hall; Bloomington, IN
2/26/1904*		Wabash	W 50–19	4–3	Old Assembly Hall; Bloomington, IN
3/5/1904*		Rose Poly	W 50–19	5–3	Old Assembly Hall; Bloomington, IN
3/12/1904*		at Purdue; Rivalry	L 21–22	5–4	Lafayette Coliseum; West Lafayette, IN
*Non-conference game. ^{#}Rankings from AP Poll. (#) Tournament seedings in parentheses.
