= 1903–04 Wisconsin Badgers men's basketball team =

American college basketball season

1903–04 Wisconsin Badgers men's basketball
- Conference: Big Ten Conference
- Record: 11–4 (0–0 Western)
- Head coach: James C. Elsom
- Home arena: Red Gym

1903–04 Western Conference men's basketball standings
	Conf.				Overall
Team	W		L	PCT	W		L	PCT
Chicago†	0	–	0	–	7	–	0	1.000
Purdue	2	–	1	.667	11	–	2	.846
Minnesota	1	–	0	1.000	10	–	2	.833
Iowa	0	–	0	–	6	–	2	.750
Wisconsin	0	–	0	–	11	–	4	.733
Indiana	0	–	2	.000	5	–	4	.556
† Intramural play only; the conference did not have an official champion winner

The 1903–04 Wisconsin Badgers men's basketball team represented University of Wisconsin–Madison. The head coach was Dr. James C. Elsom, coaching his sixth season with the Badgers. The team played their home games at the Red Gym in Madison, Wisconsin and was a member of the Western Conference.

== Schedule ==
Date time, TV	Rank^{#}	Opponent^{#}	Result	Record	Site city, state
Regular Season
11/27/1903*		at Sheboygan	W 26–24	1–0	Sheboygan, WI
11/28/1903*		at Milwaukee AC	L 18–30	1–1	Milwaukee, WI
12/19/1903*		at Chicago YMCA	L 19–62	1–2	Chicago, IL
12/29/1903*		at Milwaukee West HS	W 27–20	2–2	Milwaukee, WI
2/05/1904*		at Oshkosh YMCA	W 39–28	3–2	Oshkosh, WI
2/06/1904*		at Co. E. Fond du Lac	W 25–21	4–2	Fond du Lac, WI
2/20/1904*		Milwaukee AC	W 35–13	5–2	Red Gym; Madison, WI
2/27/1904*		at Northwestern (WI)	W 41–31	6–2	Watertown, WI
3/01/1904*		at Grinnell	W 30–28	7–2	Grinnell, IA
3/02/1904*		at Highland Park	W 29–21	8–2	Highland Park, IL
3/03/1904*		at Sioux City YMCA	L 16–44	8–3	Sioux City, IA
3/04/1904*		at Nebraska Wesleyan	W 47–32	9–3	University Place, NE
3/05/1904*		at Nebraska	L 22–25	9–4	Lincoln, NE
3/11/1904*		Co. G Madison	W 22–15	10–4	Red Gym; Madison, WI
3/18/1904*		at Co. F Portage	W 48–17	11–4	Portage, WI
*Non-conference game. ^{#}Rankings from AP Poll. (#) Tournament seedings in parentheses.
