= 1903–04 Kansas Jayhawks men's basketball team =

American college basketball season

1903–04 Kansas Jayhawks men's basketball
- Conference: Independent
- Record: 5–8
- Head coach: James Naismith (6th season)
- Captain: Harry Allen
- Home arena: Snow Hall

The 1903–04 Kansas Jayhawks men's basketball team represented the University of Kansas in its sixth season of collegiate basketball. The head coach was James Naismith, the inventor of the game, who served his 6th year. The Jayhawks finished the season 5–8.

== Roster ==
- Ira Adams
- Harry Allen
- Frank Barlow
- Andrew Brown
- Arthur Cook
- John Fleischman
- Adessie Griggs
- Albert Hicks
- James McCauley
- Manley Michaelson
- William Piatt
- Arthur Pooler
- Richard Priest

== Schedule ==
Date time, TV	Opponent	Result	Record	Site city, state
Dec. 10, 1903*	Olathe YMCA	W 35–10	1–0	Lawrence, Kansas
Dec. 12, 1903*	William Jewell	W 27–10	2–0	Lawrence, Kansas
Jan. 8, 1904*	Kansas State School for the Deaf	W 35–10	3–0	Lawrence, Kansas
Jan. 14, 1904*	Topeka YMCA	W 25–22	4–0	Lawrence, Kansas
Jan. 21, 1904*	Haskell	L 12–28	4–1	Lawrence, Kansas
Jan. 22, 1904*	at Topeka YMCA	L 16–18	4–2	Topeka, Kansas
Feb. 17, 1904*	at William Jewell	L 7–27	4–3	Liberty, Missouri
Feb. 18, 1904*	at Kansas City AC	L 10–27	4–4	Kansas City, Missouri
Feb. 22, 1904*	at Haskell	L 18–36	4–5	Lawrence, Kansas
Mar. 7, 1904*	Ottawa (KS)	L 21–25	4–6	Lawrence, Kansas
Mar. 14, 1904*	at Ottawa	L 16–26	4–7	Ottawa, Kansas
Mar. 15, 1904*	at Newton AC	W 18–10	5–7	Newton, Kansas
Mar. 16, 1904*	at Emporia Teachers College	L 13–25	5–8	Emporia, Kansas
*Non-conference game. ^{#}Rankings from AP Poll. (#) Tournament seedings in parentheses. All times are in Central Standard Time.
