= Augustana College Vikings =

Augustana Vikings
- College: Augustana College (Illinois)
- Nickname: Vikings
- NCAA: Division III
- Conference: CCIW; MPSF (men's water polo); CWPA (women's water polo)
- Athletic director: Mike Zapolski
- Location: Rock Island, Illinois
- Varsity teams: 28 (14 men's, 14 women's) (14 men's, 14 women's)
- Football stadium: Charles D. Lindberg Stadium
- Basketball arena: Roy J. Carver Center
- Baseball stadium: Swanson Stadium/Brunner Field
- Softball stadium: Carver Field
- Soccer stadium: Thorson-Lucken Field
- Colors: Blue and Gold
- Website: athletics.augustana.edu
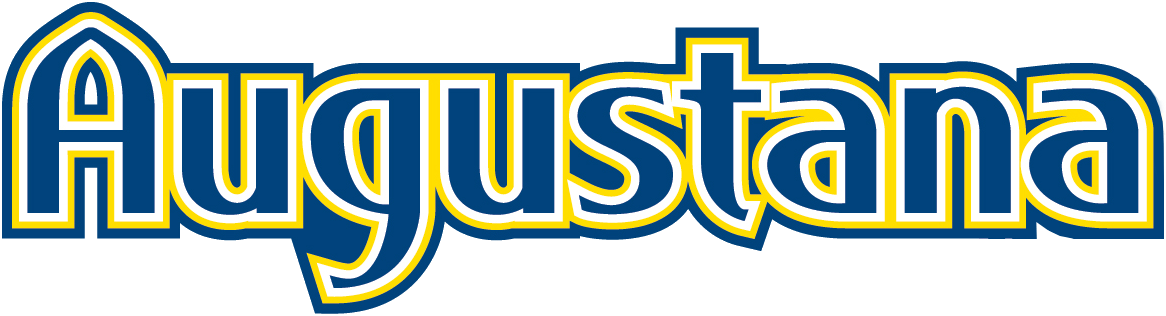

The Augustana Vikings are the intercollegiate athletic teams that represent Augustana College of Illinois. This athletic program is not to be confused with the program of Augustana University of South Dakota, also nicknamed Vikings.

Most teams compete in the NCAA Division III College Conference of Illinois and Wisconsin (CCIW). The men's and women's water polo teams, plus the women's wrestling team, are de facto Division I members. The NCAA sponsors single championship events open to members of all three divisions (what it calls the "National Collegiate" format) in men's and women's water polo. After several years as part of the NCAA Emerging Sports for Women program, women's wrestling will become an official NCAA championship sport in the 2025–26 school year, also using the National Collegiate format. Men's water polo competes in the Mountain Pacific Sports Federation, women's water polo in the Collegiate Water Polo Association, and women's wrestling in the CCIW.

The university operates a number of athletic facilities, including Charles D. Lindberg Stadium for football, the Roy J. Carver Center for both men's and women's basketball and men's and women's volleyball, Swanson Stadium/Brunner Field for baseball, the Anne Greve Lund Natatorium for men's and women's swimming and diving, the Lower Campus Courts for men's and women's tennis, Carver Field for softball, Carver Wrestling Arena for men's and women's wrestling, Thorson-Lucken Field for men's and women's soccer, and the Austin E. Knowlton Outdoor Athletic Complex for men's and women's outdoor track and field.

== Sports sponsored ==
The university offers 14 men's and 14 women's varsity sports.

Men's sports	Women's sports
Baseball	Basketball
Basketball	Bowling
Cross Country	Cross Country
Esports	Esports
Football	Golf
Golf	Lacrosse
Lacrosse	Soccer
Soccer	Softball
Swimming and Diving	Swimming and Diving
Tennis	Tennis
Track and Field	Track and Field
Volleyball	Volleyball
Water Polo	Water Polo
Wrestling	Wrestling
