= Bloomsburg Huskies =

American university athletic teams

- University: Bloomsburg University of Pennsylvania
- Conference: PSAC (primary); MAC (wrestling)
- NCAA: Division II (primary); Division I (wrestling)
- Athletic director: Dr. Michael McFarland
- Location: Bloomsburg, Pennsylvania
- Varsity teams: 21 (10 men's, 11 women's)
- Football stadium: Robert B. Redman Stadium
- Basketball arena: Nelson Field House
- Baseball stadium: Danny Litwhiler Field
- Softball stadium: Jan M. Hutchinson Field
- Soccer stadium: Steph Pettit Stadium
- Lacrosse stadium: Steph Pettit Stadium
- Mascot: Roongo
- Nickname: Huskies
- Colors: Maroon and gold
- Website: bloomsburgathletics.com
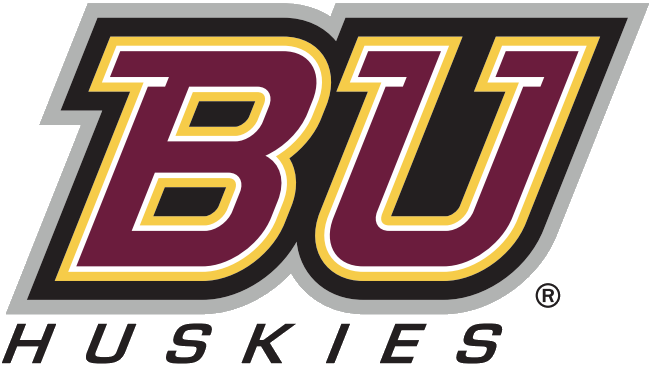

Team NCAA championships
- 15 (Division II: 13, Division III: 2)

The Bloomsburg Huskies are the athletic teams that represent Bloomsburg University of Pennsylvania, located in Bloomsburg, Pennsylvania, in NCAA Division II intercollegiate sports. The Huskies are members of the Pennsylvania State Athletic Conference (PSAC) for 18 of 19 varsity sports; as the wrestling team competes in the Mid-American Conference (MAC) as a member of the NCAA Division I. The Huskies have been a member of the PSAC since its founding in 1951.

== Varsity teams ==
=== List of teams ===
Men's sports (9)

- Baseball
- Basketball
- Cross country
- Football
- Soccer
- Swimming and diving
- Tennis
- Track and field
- Wrestling

Women's sports (10)

- Basketball
- Cross country
- Field hockey
- Lacrosse
- Soccer
- Softball
- Swimming and diving
- Tennis
- Track and field
- Volleyball (2018)

== Individual sports ==
=== Football ===
In 2000, the Bloomsburg Huskies football team were the national runner-up in Division II.

=== Softball ===
The Huskies softball team won the AIAW Division III national championship in 1982.

=== Tennis ===
In 1989, Mark Billone of the Bloomsburg Huskies won the NCAA Division II men's tennis championship in singles.

=== Wrestling ===
The Huskies wrestling team competes in the Division I Mid-American Conference with Marcus Gordon as head coach. The Nelson Field House, located on Bloomsburg University's upper campus, serves as home for the wrestling team's dual meets and tournaments. Ricky Bonomo won 3 consecutive NCAA Division I national championships for the Huskies in 1985, 1986, and 1987.

== National championships ==
The Huskies have won thirteen NCAA Division II team championships.

=== Team ===
Sport	Association	Division	Year	Opponent/Runner-up	Score
Field hockey (13)	NCAA	Division II	1983	Lock Haven	1–0
Field hockey (13)	NCAA	Division II	1993	New Haven	2–1 (2OT)
Field hockey (13)	NCAA	Division II	1996	Lock Haven	1–0
Field hockey (13)	NCAA	Division II	1997	Kutztown	2–0
Field hockey (13)	NCAA	Division II	1998	Lock Haven	4–3 (OT)
Field hockey (13)	NCAA	Division II	1999	Bentley	2–0
Field hockey (13)	NCAA	Division II	2002	Bentley	5–0
Field hockey (13)	NCAA	Division II	2003	UMass Lowell	4–1
Field hockey (13)	NCAA	Division II	2004	Bentley	3–2 (OT)
Field hockey (13)	NCAA	Division II	2006	Bentley	2–1
Field hockey (13)	NCAA	Division II	2007	UMass Lowell	5–2
Field hockey (13)	NCAA	Division II	2008	UMass Lowell	6–2
Field hockey (13)	NCAA	Division II	2009	UMass Lowell	3–2
Wrestling (3)	NAIA	—	1960	Southern Illinois	79–73
Wrestling (3)	NAIA	—	1962	Lock Haven State	56–47
Wrestling (3)	NAIA	—	1965	Lock Haven State	60–50

== Notable Huskies ==
- John Willis (born 1952): American-Israeli basketball player
- Jahri Evans: Former Left Guard for the New Orleans Saints and Super Bowl XLIV champion.
- Matt Feiler: Former guard for the Pittsburgh Steelers, current guard for Tampa Bay Buccaneers.
- Jack Fritz: Radio Personality
- Bob Tucker: former NFL tight end, New York Giants and Minnesota Vikings
