= 1902–03 collegiate men's basketball season in the United States =

American college basketball season

- Helms National Champions: Yale (retroactive selection in 1943)

The 1902–03 collegiate men's basketball season in the United States began in December 1902, progressed through the regular season, and concluded in March 1903.

== Season headlines ==
- Minnesota (13–0) went undefeated for the second consecutive season. Minnesota offered to play the eastern champion, Yale, in a post-season game to decide the national championship, but Yale refused. Minnesota then claimed it was the national champion for the 1902–03 season.
- In February 1943, the Helms Athletic Foundation retroactively selected Yale as its national champion for the 1903–04 season.
- In 1995, the Premo-Porretta Power Poll retroactively selected Minnesota as its top-ranked team for the 1903–04 season.

== Regular season ==
=== Conference winners ===
| Conference | Regular Season Winner | Conference Player of the Year | Conference Tournament | Tournament Venue (City) | Tournament Winner |
|---|---|---|---|---|---|
| Eastern Intercollegiate Basketball League | Yale | None selected | No Tournament | | |
| Western Conference | None (see note) | None selected | No Tournament | | |

NOTE: The Western Conference (the future Big Ten Conference) did not sponsor an official conference season or recognize a regular-season champion until the 1905–06 season. A few intramural games took place within the conference during the 1902–03 season. In 1902–03, Minnesota (13–0) and Purdue (8–0) both went undefeated.

1902–03 Eastern Intercollegiate Basketball League standings
| | Conf. | | | | Overall |
| Team | W | | L | PCT | W | | L | PCT |
|---|---|---|---|---|---|---|---|---|
| Yale | 7 | – | 1 | .875 | 15 | – | 1 | .938 |
| Columbia | 5 | – | 3 | .625 | 10 | – | 6 | .625 |
| Princeton | 4 | – | 4 | .500 | 8 | – | 7 | .533 |
| Cornell | 2 | – | 6 | .250 | 6 | – | 6 | .500 |
| Harvard | 2 | – | 6 | .250 | 5 | – | 8 | .385 |

1902–03 Western Conference men's basketball standings
| | Conf. | | | | Overall |
| Team | W | | L | PCT | W | | L | PCT |
|---|---|---|---|---|---|---|---|---|
| Minnesota†* | 1 | – | 0 | 1.000 | 13 | – | 0 | 1.000 |
| Purdue | 2 | – | 0 | 1.000 | 8 | – | 0 | 1.000 |
| Wisconsin | 0 | – | 1 | .000 | 5 | – | 2 | .714 |
| Indiana | 0 | – | 2 | .000 | 8 | – | 4 | .667 |
| Iowa | 0 | – | 0 | – | 4 | – | 3 | .571 |
† Intramural play only, the conference did not have an official championship *Minnesota was named Premo-Porretta National Champions winner

=== Independents ===
A total of 55 college teams played as major independents. Among teams that played at least 10 games, Bucknell (10–0) was undefeated and Williams (18–2) won the most games.

1902–03 collegiate men's basketball independents standings
| | Conf. | | | | Overall |
| Team | W | | L | PCT | W | | L | PCT |
|---|---|---|---|---|---|---|---|---|
| Army | | – | | – | 1 | – | 0 | 1.000 |
| Bucknell | | – | | – | 10 | – | 0 | 1.000 |
| Cheyenne Business College | | – | | – | 1 | – | 0 | 1.000 |
| Michigan State | | – | | – | 6 | – | 0 | 1.000 |
| Vanderbilt | | – | | – | 6 | – | 0 | 1.000 |
| Ensign College | | – | | – | 15 | – | 1 | .938 |
| Grove City | | – | | – | 13 | – | 1 | .929 |
| Geneva | | – | | – | 10 | – | 1 | .909 |
| Minnesota A&M | | – | | – | 10 | – | 1 | .909 |
| Williams | | – | | – | 18 | – | 2 | .900 |
| Colgate | | – | | – | 7 | – | 1 | .875 |
| Allegheny | | – | | – | 10 | – | 2 | .833 |
| Oregon Agricultural | | – | | – | 5 | – | 1 | .833 |
| Wheaton (Ill.) | | – | | – | 14 | – | 3 | .824 |
| Hiram | | – | | – | 4 | – | 1 | .800 |
| Wabash | | – | | – | 12 | – | 3 | .800 |
| Augustana (Ill.) | | – | | – | 3 | – | 1 | .750 |
| Haskell (Kan.) | | – | | – | 3 | – | 1 | .750 |
| Bradley | | – | | – | 5 | – | 2 | .714 |
| Connecticut | | – | | – | 5 | – | 2 | .714 |
| Fordham | | – | | – | 15 | – | 6 | .714 |
| Ohio State | | – | | – | 5 | – | 2 | .714 |
| Lehigh | | – | | – | 4 | – | 2 | .667 |
| Montana State | | – | | – | 4 | – | 2 | .667 |
| North Dakota Agricultural | | – | | – | 4 | – | 2 | .667 |
| Bloomsburg | | – | | – | 6 | – | 4 | .600 |
| Muhlenberg | | – | | – | 6 | – | 4 | .600 |
| Grinnell | | – | | – | 7 | – | 5 | .583 |
| Nebraska | | – | | – | 7 | – | 5 | .583 |
| Baker | | – | | – | 6 | – | 5 | .545 |
| Gettysburg | | – | | – | 6 | – | 5 | .545 |
| Holy Cross | | – | | – | 6 | – | 5 | .545 |
| Akron | | – | | – | 4 | – | 4 | .500 |
| Cincinnati | | – | | – | 4 | – | 4 | .500 |
| Illinois State | | – | | – | 3 | – | 3 | .500 |
| Mount Union | | – | | – | 7 | – | 7 | .500 |
| Washington State | | – | | – | 2 | – | 2 | .500 |
| Kansas | | – | | – | 7 | – | 8 | .467 |
| Temple | | – | | – | 4 | – | 5 | .444 |
| Brigham Young | | – | | – | 7 | – | 9 | .438 |
| Dartmouth | | – | | – | 8 | – | 6 | .571 |
| Indiana State | | – | | – | 5 | – | 7 | .417 |
| Wooster | | – | | – | 2 | – | 3 | .400 |
| Brown | | – | | – | 6 | – | 10 | .375 |
| Penn State | | – | | – | 3 | – | 5 | .375 |
| Wesleyan (Conn.) | | – | | – | 4 | – | 7 | .364 |
| Colorado | | – | | – | 2 | – | 4 | .333 |
| Kentucky | | – | | – | 1 | – | 2 | .333 |
| New Mexico | | – | | – | 1 | – | 2 | .333 |
| Washington | | – | | – | 2 | – | 4 | .333 |
| Wisconsin–Stevens Point | | – | | – | 1 | – | 2 | .333 |
| Butler | | – | | – | 1 | – | 3 | .250 |
| Syracuse | | – | | – | 1 | – | 8 | .111 |
| Colorado Agricultural | | – | | – | 0 | – | 1 | .000 |
| Oregon | | – | | – | 0 | – | 2 | .000 |

== Coaching changes ==
A number of teams changed coaches during the season and after it ended.

| Team | Former Coach | Interim Coach | New Coach | Reason |
|---|---|---|---|---|
| Brown | Charles Ray | | Paul DeWolf | |
| Cincinnati | Henry S. Pratt | | Anthony Chez | |
| Harvard | John Kirkland Clark | | Joseph W. Gilles | |
| Illinois State | B. C. Edwards | | John P. Stewart | |
| Indiana | Phelps Darby | | Willis Coval | |
| Iowa | Ed Rule | | Fred W. Bailey | |
| Lafayette | J. L. Baker | | W. S. Haldeman | |
| Nebraska | Fred Morrell | | Walter Hiltner | |
| Oregon Agricultural | J. B. Patterson | | J. W. Viggers | |
| Princeton | Augustus Enderbrock | | Bill Roper | |
| Purdue | Charles Best | | C. I. Freeman | |
| Vanderbilt | W. D. Weatherford | | Crinnell Jones | |
