= 1902–03 Nebraska Cornhuskers men's basketball team =

American college basketball season

1902–03 Nebraska Cornhuskers men's basketball
- Conference: Independent
- Record: 7–5
- Head coach: Walter Hiltner (1st season)
- Home arena: Grant Memorial Hall

1902–03 collegiate men's basketball independents standings
	Conf.				Overall
Team	W		L	PCT	W		L	PCT
Army		–		–	1	–	0	1.000
Bucknell		–		–	10	–	0	1.000
Cheyenne Business College		–		–	1	–	0	1.000
Michigan State		–		–	6	–	0	1.000
Vanderbilt		–		–	6	–	0	1.000
Ensign College		–		–	15	–	1	.938
Grove City		–		–	13	–	1	.929
Geneva		–		–	10	–	1	.909
Minnesota A&M		–		–	10	–	1	.909
Williams		–		–	18	–	2	.900
Colgate		–		–	7	–	1	.875
Allegheny		–		–	10	–	2	.833
Oregon Agricultural		–		–	5	–	1	.833
Wheaton (Ill.)		–		–	14	–	3	.824
Hiram		–		–	4	–	1	.800
Wabash		–		–	12	–	3	.800
Augustana (Ill.)		–		–	3	–	1	.750
Haskell (Kan.)		–		–	3	–	1	.750
Bradley		–		–	5	–	2	.714
Connecticut		–		–	5	–	2	.714
Fordham		–		–	15	–	6	.714
Ohio State		–		–	5	–	2	.714
Lehigh		–		–	4	–	2	.667
Montana State		–		–	4	–	2	.667
North Dakota Agricultural		–		–	4	–	2	.667
Bloomsburg		–		–	6	–	4	.600
Muhlenberg		–		–	6	–	4	.600
Grinnell		–		–	7	–	5	.583
Nebraska		–		–	7	–	5	.583
Baker		–		–	6	–	5	.545
Gettysburg		–		–	6	–	5	.545
Holy Cross		–		–	6	–	5	.545
Akron		–		–	4	–	4	.500
Cincinnati		–		–	4	–	4	.500
Illinois State		–		–	3	–	3	.500
Mount Union		–		–	7	–	7	.500
Washington State		–		–	2	–	2	.500
Kansas		–		–	7	–	8	.467
Temple		–		–	4	–	5	.444
Brigham Young		–		–	7	–	9	.438
Dartmouth		–		–	8	–	6	.571
Indiana State		–		–	5	–	7	.417
Wooster		–		–	2	–	3	.400
Brown		–		–	6	–	10	.375
Penn State		–		–	3	–	5	.375
Wesleyan (Conn.)		–		–	4	–	7	.364
Colorado		–		–	2	–	4	.333
Kentucky		–		–	1	–	2	.333
New Mexico		–		–	1	–	2	.333
Washington		–		–	2	–	4	.333
Wisconsin–Stevens Point		–		–	1	–	2	.333
Butler		–		–	1	–	3	.250
Syracuse		–		–	1	–	8	.111
Colorado Agricultural		–		–	0	–	1	.000
Oregon		–		–	0	–	2	.000

The 1902–03 Nebraska Cornhuskers men's basketball team represented the University of Nebraska as an independent in the 1902–03 collegiate men's basketball season. The team was led by first-year head coach Walter Hiltner and played home games at Grant Memorial Hall in Lincoln, Nebraska.

== Schedule ==
Date time, TV	Opponent	Result	Record	Site city, state
December 18, 1902	Lincoln YMCA	W 25–18	1–0	Grant Memorial Hall; Lincoln, NE
January 17, 1903	at Haskell	L 25–18	1–1	
January 24, 1903	Lincoln YMCA	L 35–24	1–2	Grant Memorial Hall; Lincoln, NE
January 31, 1903	Kansas	W 23–18	2–2	Grant Memorial Hall; Lincoln, NE
February 3, 1903	at Denver YMCA	W 44–29	3–2	
February 4, 1903	at Colorado College	W 39–11	4–2	Colorado Springs, CO
February 5, 1903	at Colorado	W 28–12	5–2	Boulder, CO
February 6, 1903	at Greeley High	W 25–15	6–2	
February 7, 1903	at Cheyenne Business	L 42–28	6–3	
February 20, 1903	Lincoln YMCA	W 33–20	7–3	Grant Memorial Hall; Lincoln, NE
March 6, 1903	at Minnesota Ag.	L 13–4	7–4	
March 7, 1903	Minnesota	L 41–14	7–5	UM Armory; Minneapolis, MN
*Non-conference game. (#) Tournament seedings in parentheses.
