= 1902–03 Cincinnati Bearcats men's basketball team =

American college basketball season

1902–03 Cincinnati Bearcats men's basketball
- Conference: Independent
- Record: 4–4
- Head coach: Anthony Chez
- Captain: Harry DeChant
- Home arena: Schmidlapp Gymnasium

1902–03 collegiate men's basketball independents standings
| | Conf. | | | | Overall |
| Team | W | | L | PCT | W | | L | PCT |
|---|---|---|---|---|---|---|---|---|
| Army | | – | | – | 1 | – | 0 | 1.000 |
| Bucknell | | – | | – | 10 | – | 0 | 1.000 |
| Cheyenne Business College | | – | | – | 1 | – | 0 | 1.000 |
| Michigan State | | – | | – | 6 | – | 0 | 1.000 |
| Vanderbilt | | – | | – | 6 | – | 0 | 1.000 |
| Ensign College | | – | | – | 15 | – | 1 | .938 |
| Grove City | | – | | – | 13 | – | 1 | .929 |
| Geneva | | – | | – | 10 | – | 1 | .909 |
| Minnesota A&M | | – | | – | 10 | – | 1 | .909 |
| Williams | | – | | – | 18 | – | 2 | .900 |
| Colgate | | – | | – | 7 | – | 1 | .875 |
| Allegheny | | – | | – | 10 | – | 2 | .833 |
| Oregon Agricultural | | – | | – | 5 | – | 1 | .833 |
| Wheaton (Ill.) | | – | | – | 14 | – | 3 | .824 |
| Hiram | | – | | – | 4 | – | 1 | .800 |
| Wabash | | – | | – | 12 | – | 3 | .800 |
| Augustana (Ill.) | | – | | – | 3 | – | 1 | .750 |
| Haskell (Kan.) | | – | | – | 3 | – | 1 | .750 |
| Bradley | | – | | – | 5 | – | 2 | .714 |
| Connecticut | | – | | – | 5 | – | 2 | .714 |
| Fordham | | – | | – | 15 | – | 6 | .714 |
| Ohio State | | – | | – | 5 | – | 2 | .714 |
| Lehigh | | – | | – | 4 | – | 2 | .667 |
| Montana State | | – | | – | 4 | – | 2 | .667 |
| North Dakota Agricultural | | – | | – | 4 | – | 2 | .667 |
| Bloomsburg | | – | | – | 6 | – | 4 | .600 |
| Muhlenberg | | – | | – | 6 | – | 4 | .600 |
| Grinnell | | – | | – | 7 | – | 5 | .583 |
| Nebraska | | – | | – | 7 | – | 5 | .583 |
| Baker | | – | | – | 6 | – | 5 | .545 |
| Gettysburg | | – | | – | 6 | – | 5 | .545 |
| Holy Cross | | – | | – | 6 | – | 5 | .545 |
| Akron | | – | | – | 4 | – | 4 | .500 |
| Cincinnati | | – | | – | 4 | – | 4 | .500 |
| Illinois State | | – | | – | 3 | – | 3 | .500 |
| Mount Union | | – | | – | 7 | – | 7 | .500 |
| Washington State | | – | | – | 2 | – | 2 | .500 |
| Kansas | | – | | – | 7 | – | 8 | .467 |
| Temple | | – | | – | 4 | – | 5 | .444 |
| Brigham Young | | – | | – | 7 | – | 9 | .438 |
| Dartmouth | | – | | – | 8 | – | 6 | .571 |
| Indiana State | | – | | – | 5 | – | 7 | .417 |
| Wooster | | – | | – | 2 | – | 3 | .400 |
| Brown | | – | | – | 6 | – | 10 | .375 |
| Penn State | | – | | – | 3 | – | 5 | .375 |
| Wesleyan (Conn.) | | – | | – | 4 | – | 7 | .364 |
| Colorado | | – | | – | 2 | – | 4 | .333 |
| Kentucky | | – | | – | 1 | – | 2 | .333 |
| New Mexico | | – | | – | 1 | – | 2 | .333 |
| Washington | | – | | – | 2 | – | 4 | .333 |
| Wisconsin–Stevens Point | | – | | – | 1 | – | 2 | .333 |
| Butler | | – | | – | 1 | – | 3 | .250 |
| Syracuse | | – | | – | 1 | – | 8 | .111 |
| Colorado Agricultural | | – | | – | 0 | – | 1 | .000 |
| Oregon | | – | | – | 0 | – | 2 | .000 |

The 1902–03 Cincinnati Bearcats men's basketball team represented the University of Cincinnati during the 1902–03 collegiate men's basketball season. The head coach was Anthony Chez, coaching his first season with the Bearcats.

== Schedule ==
| Date time, TV | Opponent | Result | Record | Site city, state |
|---|---|---|---|---|
| January 1 | at Wyoming (OH) | W 32–30 | 1–0 | |
| January 28 | Hanover | W 30–25 | 2–0 | Schmidlapp Gymnasium; Cincinnati, OH |
| February 3 | at Glendale | W 23–21 | 3–0 | |
| February 12 | Ecclectric Medical | W 50–10 | 4–0 | Schmidlapp Gymnasium; Cincinnati, OH |
| March 3 | at Circleville | L 20–37 | 4–1 | |
| March 4 | at Circleville | L 17–50 | 4–2 | |
| March 5 | at Marietta | L 15–37 | 4–3 | Marietta, OH |
| March 6 | at Marietta | L 16–29 | 4–4 | Marietta, OH |
*Non-conference game. (#) Tournament seedings in parentheses.
