= 1902–03 Syracuse Orangemen basketball team =

American college basketball season

1902–03 Syracuse Orangemen men's basketball
- Conference: Independent
- Record: 1–8
- Head coach: None
- Captain: Earl Twombley

1902–03 collegiate men's basketball independents standings
	Conf.				Overall
Team	W		L	PCT	W		L	PCT
Army		–		–	1	–	0	1.000
Bucknell		–		–	10	–	0	1.000
Cheyenne Business College		–		–	1	–	0	1.000
Michigan State		–		–	6	–	0	1.000
Vanderbilt		–		–	6	–	0	1.000
Ensign College		–		–	15	–	1	.938
Grove City		–		–	13	–	1	.929
Geneva		–		–	10	–	1	.909
Minnesota A&M		–		–	10	–	1	.909
Williams		–		–	18	–	2	.900
Colgate		–		–	7	–	1	.875
Allegheny		–		–	10	–	2	.833
Oregon Agricultural		–		–	5	–	1	.833
Wheaton (Ill.)		–		–	14	–	3	.824
Hiram		–		–	4	–	1	.800
Wabash		–		–	12	–	3	.800
Augustana (Ill.)		–		–	3	–	1	.750
Haskell (Kan.)		–		–	3	–	1	.750
Bradley		–		–	5	–	2	.714
Connecticut		–		–	5	–	2	.714
Fordham		–		–	15	–	6	.714
Ohio State		–		–	5	–	2	.714
Lehigh		–		–	4	–	2	.667
Montana State		–		–	4	–	2	.667
North Dakota Agricultural		–		–	4	–	2	.667
Bloomsburg		–		–	6	–	4	.600
Muhlenberg		–		–	6	–	4	.600
Grinnell		–		–	7	–	5	.583
Nebraska		–		–	7	–	5	.583
Baker		–		–	6	–	5	.545
Gettysburg		–		–	6	–	5	.545
Holy Cross		–		–	6	–	5	.545
Akron		–		–	4	–	4	.500
Cincinnati		–		–	4	–	4	.500
Illinois State		–		–	3	–	3	.500
Mount Union		–		–	7	–	7	.500
Washington State		–		–	2	–	2	.500
Kansas		–		–	7	–	8	.467
Temple		–		–	4	–	5	.444
Brigham Young		–		–	7	–	9	.438
Dartmouth		–		–	8	–	6	.571
Indiana State		–		–	5	–	7	.417
Wooster		–		–	2	–	3	.400
Brown		–		–	6	–	10	.375
Penn State		–		–	3	–	5	.375
Wesleyan (Conn.)		–		–	4	–	7	.364
Colorado		–		–	2	–	4	.333
Kentucky		–		–	1	–	2	.333
New Mexico		–		–	1	–	2	.333
Washington		–		–	2	–	4	.333
Wisconsin–Stevens Point		–		–	1	–	2	.333
Butler		–		–	1	–	3	.250
Syracuse		–		–	1	–	8	.111
Colorado Agricultural		–		–	0	–	1	.000
Oregon		–		–	0	–	2	.000

The 1902–03 Syracuse Orangemen men's basketball team represented Syracuse University during the 1902–03 college men's basketball season. The team captain was Earl Twombley. Instead of a head coach, the team's operations was headed by guard and team manager Frank Bohr.

== Schedule ==
Date time, TV	Opponent	Result	Record	Site city, state
1/23/1903*	at Oswego Normal	L 14–15	0–1	
2/11/1903*	St. John's Military	L 13–26	0–2	Syracuse, NY
2/14/1903*	at Colgate	L 03–49	0–3	Hamilton, NY
2/20/1903*	at Allegheny	L 11–25	0–4	
2/25/1903*	Penn State	L 13–17	0–5	Syracuse, NY
3/6/1903*	at RPI	L 13–15	0–6	
3/12/1903*	Colgate	L 10–35	0–7	Syracuse, NY
3/13/1903*	at Potsdam Normal	W 34–15	1–7	
3/14/1903*	at St. Lawrence	L 16–18	1–8	
*Non-conference game. (#) Tournament seedings in parentheses.

== Roster ==
- Earl Rice
- Arthur Brady
- Earl Twombley
- Frank Consedine
- Clarence Houseknecht
- Clinton Goodwin
- Frank Bohr
- Harley Crane
- ? Williams
- Arthur Evans
