= 1902–03 Penn State Nittany Lions basketball team =

American college basketball season

1902–03 Penn State Nittany Lions men's basketball
- Conference: Independent
- Record: 3–5–1
- Head coach: student coaches
- Captain: G.V. Storisi
- Home arena: Armory

1902–03 collegiate men's basketball independents standings
	Conf.				Overall
Team	W		L	PCT	W		L	PCT
Army		–		–	1	–	0	1.000
Bucknell		–		–	10	–	0	1.000
Cheyenne Business College		–		–	1	–	0	1.000
Michigan State		–		–	6	–	0	1.000
Vanderbilt		–		–	6	–	0	1.000
Ensign College		–		–	15	–	1	.938
Grove City		–		–	13	–	1	.929
Geneva		–		–	10	–	1	.909
Minnesota A&M		–		–	10	–	1	.909
Williams		–		–	18	–	2	.900
Colgate		–		–	7	–	1	.875
Allegheny		–		–	10	–	2	.833
Oregon Agricultural		–		–	5	–	1	.833
Wheaton (Ill.)		–		–	14	–	3	.824
Hiram		–		–	4	–	1	.800
Wabash		–		–	12	–	3	.800
Augustana (Ill.)		–		–	3	–	1	.750
Haskell (Kan.)		–		–	3	–	1	.750
Bradley		–		–	5	–	2	.714
Connecticut		–		–	5	–	2	.714
Fordham		–		–	15	–	6	.714
Ohio State		–		–	5	–	2	.714
Lehigh		–		–	4	–	2	.667
Montana State		–		–	4	–	2	.667
North Dakota Agricultural		–		–	4	–	2	.667
Bloomsburg		–		–	6	–	4	.600
Muhlenberg		–		–	6	–	4	.600
Grinnell		–		–	7	–	5	.583
Nebraska		–		–	7	–	5	.583
Baker		–		–	6	–	5	.545
Gettysburg		–		–	6	–	5	.545
Holy Cross		–		–	6	–	5	.545
Akron		–		–	4	–	4	.500
Cincinnati		–		–	4	–	4	.500
Illinois State		–		–	3	–	3	.500
Mount Union		–		–	7	–	7	.500
Washington State		–		–	2	–	2	.500
Kansas		–		–	7	–	8	.467
Temple		–		–	4	–	5	.444
Brigham Young		–		–	7	–	9	.438
Dartmouth		–		–	8	–	6	.571
Indiana State		–		–	5	–	7	.417
Wooster		–		–	2	–	3	.400
Brown		–		–	6	–	10	.375
Penn State		–		–	3	–	5	.375
Wesleyan (Conn.)		–		–	4	–	7	.364
Colorado		–		–	2	–	4	.333
Kentucky		–		–	1	–	2	.333
New Mexico		–		–	1	–	2	.333
Washington		–		–	2	–	4	.333
Wisconsin–Stevens Point		–		–	1	–	2	.333
Butler		–		–	1	–	3	.250
Syracuse		–		–	1	–	8	.111
Colorado Agricultural		–		–	0	–	1	.000
Oregon		–		–	0	–	2	.000

The 1902–03 Penn State Nittany Lions basketball team represented Penn State University during the 1902–03 college men's basketball season. The team finished with a final record of 3–5–1.

== Schedule ==
Date time, TV	Opponent	Result	Record	Site city, state
1/16/1903*	Lock Haven	W 51–0	1–0	Armory; University Park, PA
2/6/1903*	Franklin & Marshall	W 40–5	2–0	Armory; University Park, PA
2/9/1903*	at Westminster	L 18–28	2–1	
2/10/1903*	at Geneva	L 16–28	2–2	
2/11/1903*	at Grove City	L 11–33	2–3	Grove City, PA
2/12/1903*	at Allegheny	L 14–26	2–4	Meadville, PA
2/13/1903*	at Indiana State	L 19–33	2–5	Terre Haute, IN
3/6/1903*	at Williamsport YMCA	T 13–13	2–5–1	
3/19/1903*	Williamsport YMCA	W 13–9	3–5–1	Armory; University Park, PA
*Non-conference game. (#) Tournament seedings in parentheses.
