= List of Harvard Crimson men's basketball head coaches =

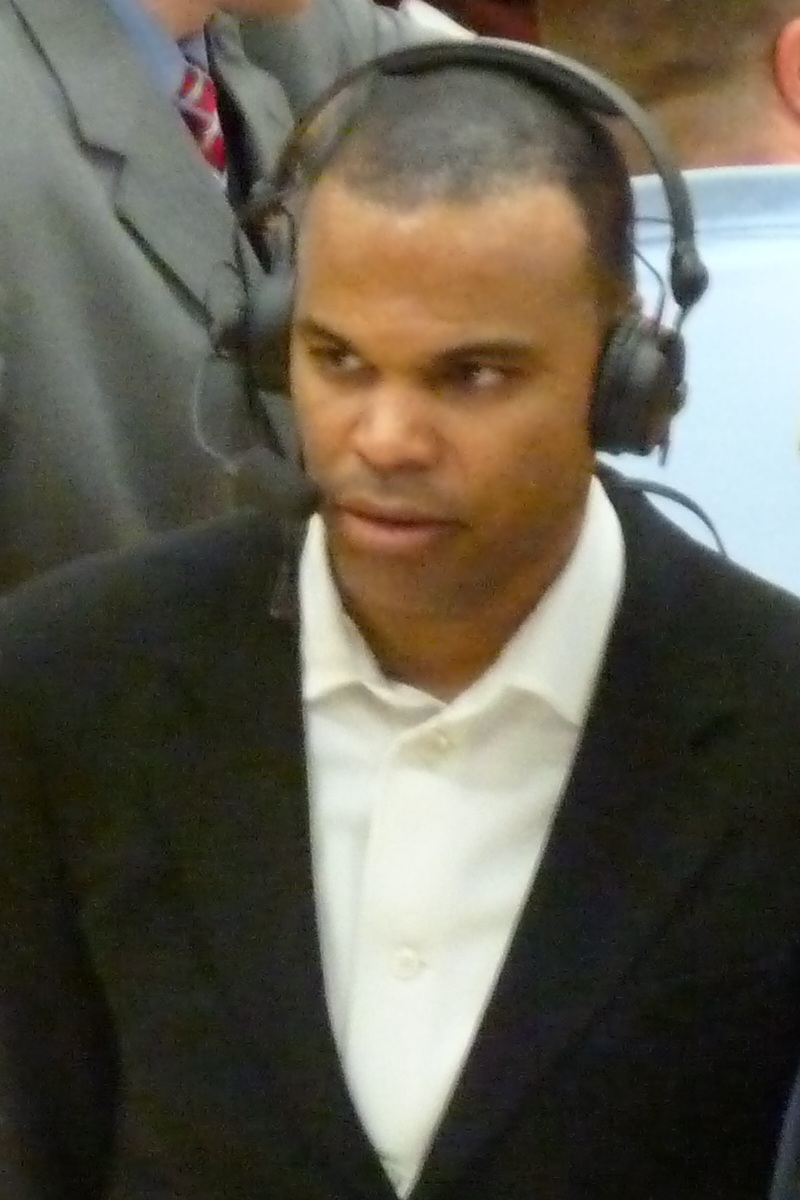
Tommy Amaker, the current head coach of the Harvard Crimson, and the winningest head coach in Crimson men's basketball history.

The following is a list of Harvard Crimson men's basketball head coaches. There have been 17 head coaches of the Crimson in their 112-season history.

Harvard's current head coach is Tommy Amaker. He was hired as the Crimson's head coach in April 2007, replacing Frank Sullivan, who was fired after the 2006–07 season.

No.	Tenure	Coach	Years	Record	Pct.
1	1900–1902	John Kirkland Clark	2	20–13	.606
2	1902–1904	Joseph W. Gilles	2	6–15	.286
–	1904–1905; 1906–1907	Captains	2	18–14	.563
3	1905–1906	C. Walter Randall	1	12–4	.750
4	1907–1909	George Grebenstein	2	5–19	.208
5	1920–1933	Ed Wachter	13	120–81	.597
6	1933–1941	Wes Fesler	8	60–96	.385
7	1941–1943	Earl Brown	2	20–30	.400
8	1943–1946	Floyd Stahl	3	23–28	.451
9	1946–1949	Bill Barclay	3	24–49	.329
10	1949–1954	Norman Shepard	5	38–83	.314
11	1954–1968	Floyd Wilson	14	143–182	.440
12	1968–1973	Bob Harrison	5	59–70	.457
13	1973–1977	Satch Sanders	4	40–60	.400
14	1977–1985	Frank McLaughlin	8	99–110	.474
15	1985–1991	Peter Roby	6	58–98	.372
16	1991–2007	Frank Sullivan	16	178–244	.422
17	2007–present (Note: Harvard's 2020–21 season was cancelled due to the COVID-19 pandemic.)	Tommy Amaker	15	278–166	.626
Totals		17 coaches	112 seasons	1,201–1,362	.469
Records updated through end of 2022–23 season Source
