= 1902–03 Kentucky Wildcats men's basketball team =

1902–03 season of University of Kentucky men's basketball team

1902–03 Kentucky Wildcats men's basketball
- Conference: Independent
- Record: 1–2
- Head coach: W. W. H. Mustaine (1st season)
- Home arena: State College Gymnasium

1902–03 collegiate men's basketball independents standings
	Conf.				Overall
Team	W		L	PCT	W		L	PCT
Army		–		–	1	–	0	1.000
Bucknell		–		–	10	–	0	1.000
Cheyenne Business College		–		–	1	–	0	1.000
Michigan State		–		–	6	–	0	1.000
Vanderbilt		–		–	6	–	0	1.000
Ensign College		–		–	15	–	1	.938
Grove City		–		–	13	–	1	.929
Geneva		–		–	10	–	1	.909
Minnesota A&M		–		–	10	–	1	.909
Williams		–		–	18	–	2	.900
Colgate		–		–	7	–	1	.875
Allegheny		–		–	10	–	2	.833
Oregon Agricultural		–		–	5	–	1	.833
Wheaton (Ill.)		–		–	14	–	3	.824
Hiram		–		–	4	–	1	.800
Wabash		–		–	12	–	3	.800
Augustana (Ill.)		–		–	3	–	1	.750
Haskell (Kan.)		–		–	3	–	1	.750
Bradley		–		–	5	–	2	.714
Connecticut		–		–	5	–	2	.714
Fordham		–		–	15	–	6	.714
Ohio State		–		–	5	–	2	.714
Lehigh		–		–	4	–	2	.667
Montana State		–		–	4	–	2	.667
North Dakota Agricultural		–		–	4	–	2	.667
Bloomsburg		–		–	6	–	4	.600
Muhlenberg		–		–	6	–	4	.600
Grinnell		–		–	7	–	5	.583
Nebraska		–		–	7	–	5	.583
Baker		–		–	6	–	5	.545
Gettysburg		–		–	6	–	5	.545
Holy Cross		–		–	6	–	5	.545
Akron		–		–	4	–	4	.500
Cincinnati		–		–	4	–	4	.500
Illinois State		–		–	3	–	3	.500
Mount Union		–		–	7	–	7	.500
Washington State		–		–	2	–	2	.500
Kansas		–		–	7	–	8	.467
Temple		–		–	4	–	5	.444
Brigham Young		–		–	7	–	9	.438
Dartmouth		–		–	8	–	6	.571
Indiana State		–		–	5	–	7	.417
Wooster		–		–	2	–	3	.400
Brown		–		–	6	–	10	.375
Penn State		–		–	3	–	5	.375
Wesleyan (Conn.)		–		–	4	–	7	.364
Colorado		–		–	2	–	4	.333
Kentucky		–		–	1	–	2	.333
New Mexico		–		–	1	–	2	.333
Washington		–		–	2	–	4	.333
Wisconsin–Stevens Point		–		–	1	–	2	.333
Butler		–		–	1	–	3	.250
Syracuse		–		–	1	–	8	.111
Colorado Agricultural		–		–	0	–	1	.000
Oregon		–		–	0	–	2	.000

The 1902–03 Kentucky State men's basketball team competed on behalf of the University of Kentucky during the 1902–03 season. Kentucky basketball's first season was an unsuccessful one, going 1–2 after losing to in-state Georgetown College Tigers, and Kentucky University Pioneers (Now Transylvania University) and beating the local YMCA team.

== Roster ==
1903–04 Kentucky Wildcats men's basketball team
Players
Coaches

Pos.	#	Name	Height	Weight	Year	Previous school	Hometown
		John Vogt	—	—	Sr	Unknown	Louisville, Kentucky
F		Lee Andrus	—	—	Sr	Unknown	Farmington, Kentucky
G		J. White Guyn	—	—	Jr	Unknown	Lexington, Kentucky
G		Henry Wurtele	—	—	Jr	Unknown	Shively, Kentucky
		Harold Moss	—	—	So	Paducah High School	Cobb, Kentucky
C		Joe Coons	—	—	So	Unknown	Mount Sterling, Kentucky
		William Goodwin	—	—	Fr	Unknown	Lexington, Kentucky
F		George Montgomery	—	—	Fr	Unknown	Liberty, Kentucky
G		Richard Arnett	—	—		Woodford County High School	Troy, Kentucky

Head coach

- W. W. H. Mustaine

Assistant coach(es)

{{{asst_coach}}}

Legend

- (C) Team captain
- (S) Suspended
- (I) Ineligible
- (W) Walk-on
- Injured
- Current redshirt

== Schedule ==
Date time, TV	Rank^{#}	Opponent^{#}	Result	Record	Site city, state
Regular Season
2/6/1903*		Georgetown College	L 6-15	0–1	State College Gymnasium; Lexington, KY
2/18/1903*		Lexington YMCA	W 11–10	1–1	State College Gymnasium; Lexington, KY
2/20/1903*		Kentucky University (now Transylvania)	L 2-42	1–2	State College Gymnasium; Lexington, KY
*Non-conference game. ^{#}Rankings from AP Poll. (#) Tournament seedings in parentheses.
