= 1902–03 Holy Cross Crusaders men's basketball team =

American college basketball season

1902–03 Holy Cross Crusaders men's basketball
- Conference: Independent
- Record: 6–5
- Head coach: J. Fred Powers (2nd season)
- Captain: James Spring
- Home arena: Mechanics Hall

1902–03 collegiate men's basketball independents standings
	Conf.				Overall
Team	W		L	PCT	W		L	PCT
Army		–		–	1	–	0	1.000
Bucknell		–		–	10	–	0	1.000
Cheyenne Business College		–		–	1	–	0	1.000
Michigan State		–		–	6	–	0	1.000
Vanderbilt		–		–	6	–	0	1.000
Ensign College		–		–	15	–	1	.938
Grove City		–		–	13	–	1	.929
Geneva		–		–	10	–	1	.909
Minnesota A&M		–		–	10	–	1	.909
Williams		–		–	18	–	2	.900
Colgate		–		–	7	–	1	.875
Allegheny		–		–	10	–	2	.833
Oregon Agricultural		–		–	5	–	1	.833
Wheaton (Ill.)		–		–	14	–	3	.824
Hiram		–		–	4	–	1	.800
Wabash		–		–	12	–	3	.800
Augustana (Ill.)		–		–	3	–	1	.750
Haskell (Kan.)		–		–	3	–	1	.750
Bradley		–		–	5	–	2	.714
Connecticut		–		–	5	–	2	.714
Fordham		–		–	15	–	6	.714
Ohio State		–		–	5	–	2	.714
Lehigh		–		–	4	–	2	.667
Montana State		–		–	4	–	2	.667
North Dakota Agricultural		–		–	4	–	2	.667
Bloomsburg		–		–	6	–	4	.600
Muhlenberg		–		–	6	–	4	.600
Grinnell		–		–	7	–	5	.583
Nebraska		–		–	7	–	5	.583
Baker		–		–	6	–	5	.545
Gettysburg		–		–	6	–	5	.545
Holy Cross		–		–	6	–	5	.545
Akron		–		–	4	–	4	.500
Cincinnati		–		–	4	–	4	.500
Illinois State		–		–	3	–	3	.500
Mount Union		–		–	7	–	7	.500
Washington State		–		–	2	–	2	.500
Kansas		–		–	7	–	8	.467
Temple		–		–	4	–	5	.444
Brigham Young		–		–	7	–	9	.438
Dartmouth		–		–	8	–	6	.571
Indiana State		–		–	5	–	7	.417
Wooster		–		–	2	–	3	.400
Brown		–		–	6	–	10	.375
Penn State		–		–	3	–	5	.375
Wesleyan (Conn.)		–		–	4	–	7	.364
Colorado		–		–	2	–	4	.333
Kentucky		–		–	1	–	2	.333
New Mexico		–		–	1	–	2	.333
Washington		–		–	2	–	4	.333
Wisconsin–Stevens Point		–		–	1	–	2	.333
Butler		–		–	1	–	3	.250
Syracuse		–		–	1	–	8	.111
Colorado Agricultural		–		–	0	–	1	.000
Oregon		–		–	0	–	2	.000

The 1902–03 Holy Cross Crusaders men's basketball team represented The College of the Holy Cross during the 1902–03 college men's basketball season. The head coach was J. Fred Powers, coaching the Crusaders in his second season.

== Schedule ==
Date time, TV	Opponent	Result	Record	Site city, state
12/18/1902*	at Cambridgeport	L 16–43	0–1	
1/10/1903*	Boston University	W 33–04	1–1	Worcester, MA
1/14/1903*	Harvard	L 9–10	1–2	Worcester, MA
1/20/1903*	at Trinity	L 11–14	1–3	Hartford, CT
1/28/1903*	Worcester Tech	W 32–04	2–3	Worcester, MA
2/10/1903*	Yale	L 10–26	2–4	Mechanics Hall; Worcester, MA
2/17/1903*	Trinity	W 37–19	3–4	Worcester, MA
2/21/1903*	Amherst	W 15–10	4–4	Worcester, MA
2/28/1903*	Worcester Tech	W 20–6	5–4	Worcester, MA
3/12/1903*	Dartmouth	W 24–19	6–4	Worcester, MA
3/18/1903*	at Amherst	L 11–34	6–5	Amherst, MA
*Non-conference game. (#) Tournament seedings in parentheses.
