= 1902–03 Bucknell Bison men's basketball team =

American college basketball season

1902–03 Bucknell Bison men's basketball
- Conference: Independent
- Record: 10–0
- Head coach: Student coaches
- Home arena: none

1902–03 collegiate men's basketball independents standings
	Conf.				Overall
Team	W		L	PCT	W		L	PCT
Army		–		–	1	–	0	1.000
Bucknell		–		–	10	–	0	1.000
Cheyenne Business College		–		–	1	–	0	1.000
Michigan State		–		–	6	–	0	1.000
Vanderbilt		–		–	6	–	0	1.000
Ensign College		–		–	15	–	1	.938
Grove City		–		–	13	–	1	.929
Geneva		–		–	10	–	1	.909
Minnesota A&M		–		–	10	–	1	.909
Williams		–		–	18	–	2	.900
Colgate		–		–	7	–	1	.875
Allegheny		–		–	10	–	2	.833
Oregon Agricultural		–		–	5	–	1	.833
Wheaton (Ill.)		–		–	14	–	3	.824
Hiram		–		–	4	–	1	.800
Wabash		–		–	12	–	3	.800
Augustana (Ill.)		–		–	3	–	1	.750
Haskell (Kan.)		–		–	3	–	1	.750
Bradley		–		–	5	–	2	.714
Connecticut		–		–	5	–	2	.714
Fordham		–		–	15	–	6	.714
Ohio State		–		–	5	–	2	.714
Lehigh		–		–	4	–	2	.667
Montana State		–		–	4	–	2	.667
North Dakota Agricultural		–		–	4	–	2	.667
Bloomsburg		–		–	6	–	4	.600
Muhlenberg		–		–	6	–	4	.600
Grinnell		–		–	7	–	5	.583
Nebraska		–		–	7	–	5	.583
Baker		–		–	6	–	5	.545
Gettysburg		–		–	6	–	5	.545
Holy Cross		–		–	6	–	5	.545
Akron		–		–	4	–	4	.500
Cincinnati		–		–	4	–	4	.500
Illinois State		–		–	3	–	3	.500
Mount Union		–		–	7	–	7	.500
Washington State		–		–	2	–	2	.500
Kansas		–		–	7	–	8	.467
Temple		–		–	4	–	5	.444
Brigham Young		–		–	7	–	9	.438
Dartmouth		–		–	8	–	6	.571
Indiana State		–		–	5	–	7	.417
Wooster		–		–	2	–	3	.400
Brown		–		–	6	–	10	.375
Penn State		–		–	3	–	5	.375
Wesleyan (Conn.)		–		–	4	–	7	.364
Colorado		–		–	2	–	4	.333
Kentucky		–		–	1	–	2	.333
New Mexico		–		–	1	–	2	.333
Washington		–		–	2	–	4	.333
Wisconsin–Stevens Point		–		–	1	–	2	.333
Butler		–		–	1	–	3	.250
Syracuse		–		–	1	–	8	.111
Colorado Agricultural		–		–	0	–	1	.000
Oregon		–		–	0	–	2	.000

The 1902–03 Bucknell Bison men's basketball team represented Bucknell University during the 1902–03 college men's basketball season. The team finished the season with an overall record of 10–0.

== Schedule ==
Date time, TV	Opponent	Result	Record	Site city, state
1/16/1903*	Coll. of Pharmacy	W 159–5	1–0	Lewisburg, PA
1/23/1903*	Gettysburg	W 55–20	2–0	Lewisburg, PA
2/7/1903*	at Franklin & Marshall	W 67–11	3–0	Lewisburg, PA
2/10/1903*	Ashland	W 57–12	4–0	Lewisburg, PA
2/28/1903*	Danville	W 45–17	5–0	Lewisburg, PA
3/7/1903*	LaSalle	W 15–13	6–0	Lewisburg, PA
3/10/1903*	Williamsport	W 16–5	7–0	Lewisburg, PA
3/12/1902*	at F&M	W 33–30	8–0	
3/13/1903*	at Gettysburg	W 23–10	9–0	Gettysburg, PA
3/17/1903*	Lehigh	W 10–6	10–0	Lewisburg, PA
*Non-conference game. (#) Tournament seedings in parentheses.
