= List of Minnesota Golden Gophers men's basketball seasons =

== Results by season ==
Table of results
| Season | Overall record | Conference record | Post-season | Notes |
|---|---|---|---|---|
| 1895–96 | 4–7 | none | none | |
| 1896–97 | 3–6–1 | none | none | |
| 1897–98 | 5–8–1 | none | none | |
| 1898–99 | 5–5 | none | none | |
| 1899–1900 | 10–3 | none | none | |
| 1900–01 | 11–1 | none | none | |
| 1901-02 | 15–0 | none | none | Helms National Champions |
| 1902-03 | 13–0 | none | none | |
| 1903–04 | 10–2 | none | none | |
| 1904–05 | 7–7–1 | none | none | |
| 1905–06 | 13–2 | 6–1 | none | |
| 1906–07 | 10–2 | 6–2 | none | |
| 1907–08 | 11–7 | 2–6 | none | |
| 1908–09 | 8–6 | 3–6 | none | |
| 1909–10 | 10–3 | 7–3 | none | |
| 1910–11 | 9–4 | 8–4 | none | |
| 1911–12 | 7–6 | 6–6 | none | |
| 1912–13 | 3–8 | 2–8 | none | |
| 1913–14 | 4–11 | 4–8 | none | |
| 1914–15 | 11–6 | 6–6 | none | |
| 1915–16 | 10–6 | 6–6 | none | |
| 1916–17 | 17–2 | 10–2 | none | |
| 1917–18 | 9–3 | 7–3 | none | |
| 1918–19 | 13–0 | 10–0 | none | Helms National Champions |
| 1919–20 | 8–8 | 3–9 | none | |
| 1920–21 | 10–5 | 7–5 | none | |
| 1921–22 | 5–8 | 4–7 | none | |
| 1922–23 | 2–13 | 1–11 | none | |
| 1923–24 | 9–9 | 5–7 | none | |
| 1924–25 | 9–7 | 6–6 | none | |
| 1925–26 | 6–10–1 | 5–7 | none | |
| 1926–27 | 3–13 | 1–11 | none | |
| 1927–28 | 4–12 | 2–10 | none | |
| 1928–29 | 4–13 | 1–11 | none | |
| 1929–30 | 8–9 | 3–9 | none | |
| 1930–31 | 13–4 | 8–4 | none | |
| 1931–32 | 15–3 | 9–3 | none | |
| 1932–33 | 5–15 | 1–11 | none | |
| 1933–34 | 9–11 | 5–7 | none | |
| 1934–35 | 11–9 | 5–7 | none | |
| 1935–36 | 7–17 | 3–9 | none | |
| 1936–37 | 14–6 | 10–2 | none | |
| 1937–38 | 16–4 | 9–3 | none | |
| 1938–39 | 14–6 | 7–5 | none | |
| 1939–40 | 13–8 | 5–7 | none | |
| 1940–41 | 11–9 | 7–5 | none | |
| 1941–42 | 15–7 | 9–6 | none | |
| 1942–43 | 10–9 | 5–7 | none | |
| 1943–44 | 7–14 | 2–10 | none | |
| 1944–45 | 8–13 | 4–8 | none | |
| 1945–46 | 14–7 | 7–5 | none | |
| 1946–47 | 14–7 | 7–5 | none | |
| 1947–48 | 10–10 | 5–7 | none | |
| 1948–49 | 18–3 | 9–3 | none | |
| 1949–50 | 13–9 | 4–8 | none | |
| 1950–51 | 13–9 | 7–7 | none | |
| 1951–52 | 15–7 | 10–4 | none | |
| 1952–53 | 14–8 | 11–7 | none | |
| 1953–54 | 17–5 | 10–4 | none | |
| 1954–55 | 15–7 | 10–4 | none | |
| 1955–56 | 11–11 | 6–8 | none | |
| 1956–57 | 14–8 | 9–5 | none | |
| 1957–58 | 9–12 | 5–9 | none | |
| 1958–59 | 8–14 | 5–9 | none | |
| 1959–60 | 12–12 | 8–6 | none | |
| 1960–61 | 10–13 | 8–6 | none | |
| 1961–62 | 10–14 | 6–8 | none | |
| 1962–63 | 12–12 | 8–6 | none | |
| 1963–64 | 17–7 | 10–4 | none | |
| 1964–65 | 19–5 | 11–3 | none | |
| 1965–66 | 14–10 | 7–7 | none | |
| 1966–67 | 9–15 | 5–9 | none | |
| 1967–68 | 7–17 | 4–10 | none | |
| 1968–69 | 12–12 | 6–8 | none | |
| 1969–70 | 13–11 | 7–7 | none | |
| 1970–71 | 11–13 | 5–9 | none | |
| 1971–72 | 18–7 | 11–3 | NCAA 2nd Round | |
| 1972–73 | 21–5 | 10–4 | NIT 2nd Round | |
| 1973–74 | 12–12 | 6–8 | none | |
| 1974–75 | 18–8 | 11–7 | none | |
| 1975–76 | 16–10 | 8–10 | none | |
| 1976–77 | 24–3 | 15–3 | none | Records unofficial due to NCAA sanctions (0–27, 0–18); Team barred from appearing in post-season |
| 1977–78 | 17–11 | 12–6 | none | Team barred from appearing in post-season |
| 1978–79 | 11–16 | 6–12 | none | |
| 1979–80 | 21–11 | 10–8 | NIT Runner-up | |
| 1980–81 | 19–11 | 9–9 | NIT 3rd Round | |
| 1981–82 | 23–6 | 14–4 | NCAA 2nd Round | |
| 1982–83 | 18–11 | 9–9 | NIT 1st Round | |
| 1983–84 | 15–13 | 6–12 | none | |
| 1984–85 | 13–15 | 6–12 | none | |
| 1985–86 | 15–16 | 5–13 | none | Coach Jim Dutcher resigned midseason; replaced by Jimmy Williams |
| 1986–87 | 9–19 | 2–16 | none | |
| 1987–88 | 10–18 | 4–14 | none | |
| 1988–89 | 19–12 | 9–9 | NCAA Sweet 16 | |
| 1989–90 | 23–9 | 11–7 | NCAA Elite 8 | |
| 1990–91 | 12–16 | 5–13 | none | |
| 1991–92 | 16–16 | 8–10 | NIT 1st Round | |
| 1992–93 | 22–10 | 9–9 | NIT Champions | |
| 1993-94 | 21–12 | 10–8 | NCAA 2nd Round | Unofficial Record – Academic Fraud |
| 1994-95 | 19–12 | 10–8 | NCAA 1st Round | Unofficial Record – Academic Fraud |
| 1995–96 | 19–11 | 10–8 | NIT 2nd Round | Unofficial Record – Academic Fraud |
| 1996–97 | 31–4 | 16–2 | NCAA Final Four | Unofficial Record – Academic Fraud |
| 1997–98 | 20–15 | 6–10 | NIT Champions | Unofficial Record – Academic Fraud |
| 1998–99 | 17–11 | 6–10 | NCAA 1st Round | Unofficial Record – Academic Fraud |
| 1999–2000 | 12–16 | 4–12 | none | |
| 2000–01 | 18–14 | 5–11 | NIT 2nd Round | |
| 2001–02 | 18–13 | 9–7 | NIT 2nd Round | |
| 2002–03 | 19–14 | 8–8 | NIT 4th Place | |
| 2003–04 | 12–18 | 3–13 | none | |
| 2004–05 | 21–11 | 10–6 | NCAA 1st Round | |
| 2005–06 | 16–15 | 5–11 | NIT 2nd Round | |
| 2006–07 | 9–22 | 3–13 | none | Coach Dan Monson resigned midseason; replaced by Jim Molinari |
| 2007–08 | 20–14 | 8–10 | NIT 1st Round | |
| 2008–09 | 22–11 | 9–9 | NCAA 1st Round | |
| 2009–10 | 21–14 | 9–9 | NCAA 1st Round | |
| 2010–11 | 17–14 | 6–12 | none | |
| 2011–12 | 23–15 | 6–12 | NIT Runner-up | |
| 2012–13 | 21–13 | 8–10 | NCAA 3rd Round | Tubby Smith fired after season |
| 2013–14 | 25–13 | 8–10 | NIT Champions | First Championship win under Richard Pitino |
| 2014–15 | 18–15 | 6–12 | none | |
| 2015–16 | 8–23 | 2–16 | none | |
| 2016–17 | 24–10 | 11–7 | NCAA 1st Round | First appearance at the NCAA men's basketball tournament under Richard Pitino |
| 2017–18 | 15–17 | 4–14 | none | |
| 2018–19 | 22–14 | 9–11 | NCAA 2nd Round | |
| 2019–20 | 15–16 | 8–12 | none | Remaining Big Ten tournament games cancelled due to the COVID-19 pandemic |
| 2020–21 | 14–15 | 6–14 | none | Richard Pitino fired after season |
| 2021–22 | 13–17 | 4–16 | none | |
| 2022–23 | 9–22 | 2–17 | none | |
| 2023–24 | 19–15 | 9–11 | NIT 2nd Round | |
| 2024–25 | 15–17 | 7–13 | none | |
NOTE: Records used are official Gophers records; these records include the 1976–77 season, which Minnesota protests as ineligible, but exclude the 1993–94 through 1998–99 seasons. With these seasons included in the Gophers record: Overall Record: 1548–1145 (.575); *Conference Championships in GOLD. Source:
