= Yale Murphy =

American baseball player (1869–1906)

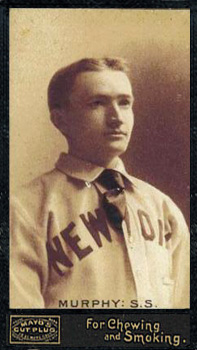
- Infielder / Outfielder
- Born: October 11, 1869; Southville, Massachusetts, U.S.
- Died: February 14, 1906 (aged 36); Westborough, Massachusetts, U.S.
- Batted: Left Threw: Right

MLB debut
- April 19, 1894, for the New York Giants

Last MLB appearance
- July 26, 1897, for the New York Giants

MLB statistics
- Batting average: .240
- Home runs: 0
- Runs batted in: 45
- Stats at Baseball Reference

Teams
- New York Giants (1894–1895, 1897)
Coaching career
Coaching career (HC unless noted)
Football
1900–1901	Stanford (trainer)
1902	Fordham
1904	Navy (trainer)
Basketball
1902–1903	Yale
Baseball
1898–1899	Penn
1900–1901	Stanford
1902	Columbia
1903	Yale
1905	Navy
Track and field
1900–1902	Stanford
Head coaching record
Overall	3–4–1 (football); 15–1 (basketball)
Accomplishments and honors
Championships
Basketball; 1 Helms national (1903)

William Henry Murphy (October 11, 1869 – February 14, 1906), nicknamed "Yale, "Tot", and "Midget", was an American professional baseball player and coach of college football, college basketball, and college baseball. He played as a shortstop, third baseman, and outfielder in Major League Baseball (MLB) for the New York Giants of the National League (NL) between 1894 and 1897. Murphy served as the head baseball coach at the University of Pennsylvania from 1898 to 1899, Stanford University from 1900 to 1901, Columbia University in 1902, his alma mater—Yale University—in 1903, and the United States Naval Academy in 1905. He was also the head football coach at Fordham University in 1902, tallying a mark of 3–4–1, and the head basketball coach at Yale for one season, in 1902–03.

== Early life and playing career ==
Murphy was born in Southville, Massachusetts. At the age of 15, he graduated from high school in Westborough, Massachusetts, and then studied at Phillips Exeter Academy in Exeter, New Hampshire. He attended Yale University, where he earned the nickname "Yale", before graduating in 1893. Murphy then played for the National League's New York Giants in 1894, 1895, and 1897. Also called "Tot" or "Midget", Murphy was small even for his era. He was 5 ft 3 in (1.60 m) tall and weighed 125 lbs. He and Dickey Pearce are the two shortest players ever to have a career in Major League Baseball. In 1894, there was a book written about him that was entitled Yale Murphy, the Great Short-Stop, or, The Little Midget of the Giants.

Murphy started his professional baseball career in 1894. That season, he was a backup shortstop and outfielder, playing in a career-high 75 games, batting .272, and stealing 28 bases. In 1895, he played mostly in the outfield. He hit just .201 and did not play for the Giants in 1896. He returned for a few games in 1897 and then played one season (1900) in the New York State League. Murphy batted .240 in 131 career games.

== Coaching career and death ==
While playing for the Giants, Murphy began studying medicine at Columbia University College of Physicians and Surgeons in Manhattan. After leaving professional baseball, he completed his medical degree at the University of Pennsylvania School of Medicine—now known as the Perelman School of Medicine—graduating in 1899. While at Penn, he coached the Penn Quakers baseball team in 1898 and 1899. In the fall of 1902, Murphy was appointed football and baseball coach at Fordham College. The following January, he returned to Yale to mentor the baseball team. That summer, he signed to play shortstop and captain the New Haven Blues of the Connecticut League. In the summer of 1904, Murphy was hired as football and baseball coach at the United States Naval Academy. He served as trainer for the football team, which was led by head coach Paul Dashiell.

In late 1905, Murphy had fallen ill with tuberculosis, and went to Saranac Lake, New York for treatment. He died from his illness, on February 14, 1906. Murphy's place of death was reported alternatively as his home in Southville and as Westborough. He was the brother of Mike Murphy, athletic trainer and coach. His nephew, Fred J. Murphy, was also an athlete at Yale and college sports coach.

== Head coaching record ==
=== Football ===
Year	Team	Overall	Conference	Standing	Bowl/playoffs
Fordham (Independent) (1902)
1902	Fordham	3–4–1			
Fordham:		3–4–1			
Total:		3–4–1			

=== Basketball ===
Record table
Season	Team	Overall	Conference	Standing	Postseason
Yale Bulldogs (Eastern Intercollegiate Basketball League) (1902–1903)
1902–03	Yale	15–1	7–1	1st	Helms National Champions
Yale:		15–1 (.938)	7–1 (.875)		
Total:		15–1 (.938)			
National champion Postseason invitational champion Conference regular season champion Conference regular season and conference tournament champion Division regular season champion Division regular season and conference tournament champion Conference tournament champion
