= Floyd Wilson =

American basketball coach

Floyd Wilson was a basketball coach at Harvard University. Wilson coached for 14 years from 1954 to 1968. Prior to becoming the Varsity head-coach, Wilson spent time as the Freshman basketball coach. While coaching Harvard, Wilson won 143 games. This mark stood as the most wins for a Crimson coach until Frank Sullivan passed the mark in 2004. Each year the 'Floyd Wilson Sportsmanship Award' is given to the Harvard basketball player "whose respect for sportsmanship recalls the manner and values of Floyd Wilson" As with most coaches, Coach Wilson was not immune to criticisms from the press. Wilson was replaced by NBA All-Star Bob Harrison as head coach in 1968. His best season came in 1957–58 when the team went 16–9 and finished 5th in the Ivy League.
