= Karl A. Fox =

American economist (1917–2008)

- Born: July 14, 1917; Salt Lake City, Utah
- Died: April 20, 2008 (aged 90); Ames, Iowa

Academic background
- Education: University of California, Berkeley; University of Utah

Karl August Fox (July 14, 1917 – April 20, 2008) was an American economist. He was a professor of economics at Iowa State University from 1955 to 1987. During 1954–55, he was senior staff economist with the President's Council of Economic Advisers. In 1961 he was elected as a Fellow of the American Statistical Association.

Born in Salt Lake City, Utah, Fox attended the University of Utah, earning a BA degree in English in 1937 and an MA in sociology in 1938. He earned a Ph.D. in economics at the University of California, Berkeley in 1954, with a dissertation on the demand for farm products, resulting from research conducted at the Bureau of Agricultural Economics.

His father was Feramorz Y. Fox.
