= Scotty Wood Stadium =

Sports stadium in Allentown, Pennsylvania

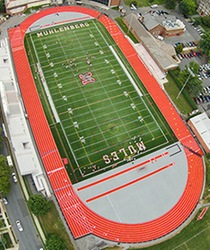
- Aerial view of Scotty Wood Stadium in December 2017
- Interactive map of Scotty Wood Stadium
- Address: 2400 W. Chew Street; Allentown, Pennsylvania, U.S.
- Location: Allentown, Pennsylvania
- Coordinates: 40.598701°N 75.5118047°W
- Owner: Muhlenberg College
- Operator: Muhlenberg College

Construction
- Opened: 1999
- Renovated: 2008

Tenants
- Muhlenberg Mules football, field hockey, and track and field teams

Scotty Wood Stadium is the college football, field hockey, and track and field stadium of Muhlenberg College in Allentown, Pennsylvania. The college's athletics teams are known as the Muhlenberg Mules.

== History ==
Scotty Wood Stadium was opened and dedicated in 1999. The stadium's bleacher capacity is 3,000. In 2008, the stadium's football field was resurfaced with AstroTurf. The stadium's track, used by its track and field team, underwent all-weather resurfacing in 2014.

The stadium is named for Milton W. "Scotty" Wood, founder of Wood Dining Services. The stadium's field is named for Frank Marino, who served as Muhlenberg's head football coach from 1970 to 1980, head coach of its men's lacrosse team from 1968 to 1977, and head coach of its volleyball team from 1988 to 1995.

Since its 1999 opening, the stadium has hosted three Centennial Conference championship track meets, four NCAA tournament football games, and an ECAC field hockey playoff game.
