= Antonio Vázquez de Espinosa =

Spanish missionary priest

Fray Antonio Vazquez de Espinosa (born in Jerez de la Frontera and died Seville, 1630) was a Spanish friar of the Discalced Carmelites originally from Jerez de la Frontera whose Compendio y Descripcion de las Indias Occidentales has become a source of detail for the history of South America, since the manuscript's discovery in the Vatican Library in 1929.

Travelling in Mexico and Peru where he proselytized among the Native Americans, he returned to Spain in 1622, where he continued to move about, in Málaga, Madrid, Seville and other places.

He was the author of the following printed works:

- Confessionario general, luz y guía del cielo y método para poderse confesar
- Viaje y Navegación del año de 1622 que hizo la flota de Nueva España y Honduras (Málaga, 1624)
- Sumario de Indulgencias (Málaga 1623)
- Circunstancias para los tratos y contratos de las Indias del Perú y Nueva España (Málaga, 1624)
- Indiæ Descriptionem

The work he is now remembered for, he never published. The manuscript was discovered in the Barberini archives of the Vatican Library in 1929 by Dr Charles Upson Clark, who edited it for the series Smithsonian Miscellaneous Collections in English (1942) and Spanish (1944). It was reprinted in 1948.
