= 1902–03 Michigan State Normal Normalites men's basketball team =

American college basketball season

1902–03 Michigan State Normal Normalites men's basketball
- Conference: Independent
- Record: 2–6
- Head coach: Clayton T. Teetzel (2nd season)
- Assistant coach: Charles B. Jordan
- Home arena: Gymnasium

The 1902–03 team finished with a record 1–5. It was the second and final year for head coach Clayton T. Teetzel. The team captain was R.C. Smith and team manager was C.B. Jordan.

== Roster ==
Number	Name	Position	Class	Hometown
	Seiford J. Cowan	Forward	Sophomore	Rockford, MI
	Charles M. Novak	Forward		
	Charles Salsbury	Forward	Senior	
	Wilbur M. Morris	Guard	Junior	
	Albert Graham	Guard/Center	Junior	
	Milton B. Huston	Guard		
	Robert C. Smith	Center	Senior	Bath, MI
	Jason Hayward		Junior	

1903 Michigan Normal College Men's Basketball Team

== Schedule ==
Date time, TV	Rank^{#}	Opponent^{#}	Result	Record	Site (attendance) city, state
Non-conference regular season
January 24, 1903*		Detroit YMCA	L 14-24	0-1	Gymnasium; Ypsilanti, Michigan
February 7, 1903*; 3:30		at Hillsdale College	W 15-12 ^{OT}	1-1	Dickerson Gym; Hillsdale, Michigan
February 13, 1903*		Michigan State	L 7-23	1-2	Gymnasium; Ypsilanti, Michigan
February 26, 1903*		at Detroit YMCA All-Stars	L 6-32	1-3	YMCA Gym; Detroit, Michigan
February 28, 1903*		Detroit-Parke-Davis & Co.	L 2-23	1-4	Gymnasium; Ypsilanti, Michigan
March 6, 1903*; 8:00		at Governor's Guard	L 17-24	1-5	Lansing, MI
March 7, 1903*		at Michigan State	L 5-49	1-6	Armory; East Lansing, MI
March 21, 1903*		Hillsdale	W 31-5	2-6	Gymnasium; Ypsilanti, Michigan
*Non-conference game. ^{#}Rankings from AP Poll. (#) Tournament seedings in parentheses. All times are in Eastern Time.

The last two games agasint the Detroit YMCA were postponed and never rescheduled.

== Game summaries ==
=== January 24, 1903 ===
Score was 6-10 at the half. Novac scored 9 points for EMU, 7 from the free throws and 2 from the field. Media Guide had 11-18 but the school paper has 14-24

=== February 7, 1903 ===
The game was notable for fouls, with the score at the end of the first half was 9-1. The Normals won in overtime.
