= Feramorz Y. Fox =

- Born: September 28, 1881
- Died: November 29, 1957 (aged 76)
- Occupation: University administrator
- Title: President of Latter-day Saints University
- Spouse: Anna Wilcken (m. 1906)
- Children: Karl A. Fox
- Parent(s): Jesse W. Fox Jr & Ruth May Fox

Academic background
- Education: University of Utah; Master's degree, University of California, Berkeley; PhD, Northwestern University

Academic work
- Discipline: Economist
- Institutions: Latter-day Saints University
- Notable students: Gordon B. Hinckley, Russell M. Nelson, George W. Romney
- Notable works: Building the City of God: Community and Cooperation Among the Mormons

President of Latter-day Saints University
- In office 1926–1948

Feramorz Y. Fox (28 September 1881 – 29 November 1957) was a president of Latter-day Saints University, which later became LDS Business College.

Fox was the son of Jesse W. Fox Jr., and Ruth May Fox. He was born and raised in Salt Lake City, Utah Territory. He graduated from the University of Utah in 1906. That same year he married Anna Wilcken; they would become the parents of three children. Fox began teaching at what was known as Latter-day Saints University that year, the institution that is the predecessor of LDS Business College. In 1910, Fox received a Willard D. Thompson scholarship to attend the University of California, Berkeley. He received his master's degree in economics in 1912. In the 1920s he took leave of LDS Business College, this time to work on a Ph.D. at Northwestern University, which he completed in 1932.

From 1926, Fox was the president of Latter-day Saints University, presiding over the high school, junior college and business school. Among the students who studied there while Fox was president were Gordon B. Hinckley, Russell M. Nelson, and George W. Romney. In 1931, the institution was scaled back to only the business college. Fox continued as president until 1948, serving in that office for 22 years.

Fox was an active member of the Church of Jesus Christ of Latter-day Saints (LDS Church), serving on the high council of the Emigration Stake, which encompassed the Avenues in Salt Lake City. When the Ensign Stake was split off to cover the western portion of the avenues, Fox was appointed to the Sunday School board of that stake. He was a member of the Kiwanis Club, and served as president in 1944–45.

In the 1930s, Fox wrote a long manuscript on the history of economic cooperation in the LDS Church that he was unable to get published at that time. After his death, his son Karl A. Fox, an economics professor at Iowa State University, was able to convince LDS Church Historian Leonard J. Arrington and Dean L. May to revise and extend the work, and it was published in 1976 as Building the City of God: Community and Cooperation Among the Mormons; a second edition was published in 1992.
