= Haskell Memorial Stadium =

Sport stadium in Lawrence, Kansas

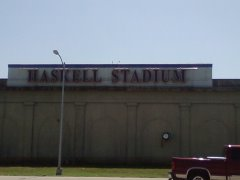
- Exterior of the stadium in 2010
- Interactive map of Haskell Memorial Stadium
- Address: Lawrence, Kansas; United States
- Coordinates: 38°56′26″N 95°13′49″W
- Owner: Haskell University
- Operator: Haskell University Athletics
- Capacity: 11,000
- Type: Stadium
- Surface: Grass
- Current use: Football

Construction
- Opened: 1926; 100 years ago

Tenants
- Haskell Fighting Indians football (1926–2015); Lawrence High School; Free State High School

Haskell Memorial Stadium is a stadium located on the campus of Haskell Indian Nations University in Lawrence, Kansas. It was the home venue to the Haskell football team until 2015 when the university cut the program due to financial problems.

The facility was formerly used by local high school teams such as Lawrence High School and Free State High School.
