= Kate Upson Clark =

American writer (1851–1935)

Catherine Pickens Upson Clark (February 22, 1851 – February 18, 1935) was an American writer. She wrote articles for Godey's Lady's Book, Atlantic Monthly, Christian Herald, and Harper's Magazine. She was an editor of the Springfield Republican, Good Cheer Magazine, and later the New York Evening Post. She published several books, short stories, and one novel.

== Biography ==
She was born on February 22, 1851, in Camden, Alabama, to Edwin Upson and Priscilla Maxwell. She was raised in Charlemont, Massachusetts, and she graduated from Wheaton Female Seminary in Norton, Massachusetts, in 1869. In 1874 she married Edward Perkins Clark, and they had three sons, Charles Upson Clark, John Kirkland Clark and George Maxwell Clark. She died on February 18, 1935.

== Selected works ==
- That Mary Ann: the Story of a Country Summer (Boston: D. Lothrop Co., 1893, illustrated by M. L. Kirk)
