= 1902–03 Wisconsin Badgers men's basketball team =

American college basketball season

1902–03 Wisconsin Badgers men's basketball
- Conference: Big Ten Conference
- Record: 5–2 (0–1 Western)
- Head coach: James C. Elsom
- Home arena: Red Gym

1902–03 Western Conference men's basketball standings
	Conf.				Overall
Team	W		L	PCT	W		L	PCT
Minnesota†*	1	–	0	1.000	13	–	0	1.000
Purdue	2	–	0	1.000	8	–	0	1.000
Wisconsin	0	–	1	.000	5	–	2	.714
Indiana	0	–	2	.000	8	–	4	.667
Iowa	0	–	0	–	4	–	3	.571
† Intramural play only, the conference did not have an official championship *Minnesota was named Premo-Porretta National Champions winner

The 1902–03 Wisconsin Badgers men's basketball team represented University of Wisconsin–Madison. The head coach was Dr. James C. Elsom, coaching his fifth season with the Badgers. The team played their home games at the Red Gym in Madison, Wisconsin and was a member of the Western Conference.

== Schedule ==
Date time, TV	Rank^{#}	Opponent^{#}	Result	Record	Site city, state
Regular Season
11/28/1902*		at Sheboygan YMCA	W 45–16	1–0	Sheboygan, WI
12/19/1902*		at Dubuque YMCA	W 34–14	2–0	Dubuque, IA
2/21/1903		at Minnesota	L 11–33	2–1	Minnesota Armory; Minneapolis, MN
2/28/1903*		at Co. E. Fond du Lac	L 17–21	2–2	Fond du Lac, WI
3/06/1903*		at Duluth YMCA	W 42–16	3–2	Duluth, MN
3/07/1903*		at Superior Normal	W 28–7	4–2	Superior, WI
3/13/1903*		at Wausau YMCA	W 37–33	5–2	Wausau, WI
*Non-conference game. ^{#}Rankings from AP Poll. (#) Tournament seedings in parentheses.
