= 1902–03 Yale Bulldogs men's basketball team =

American college basketball season

1902–03 Yale Bulldogs men's basketball

EIBL Champions Helms Foundation National Champions
- Conference: Eastern Intercollegiate Basketball League
- Record: 15–1 (7–1 EIBL)
- Head coach: Yale Murphy

1902–03 Eastern Intercollegiate Basketball League standings
| | Conf. | | | | Overall |
| Team | W | | L | PCT | W | | L | PCT |
|---|---|---|---|---|---|---|---|---|
| Yale | 7 | – | 1 | .875 | 15 | – | 1 | .938 |
| Columbia | 5 | – | 3 | .625 | 10 | – | 6 | .625 |
| Princeton | 4 | – | 4 | .500 | 8 | – | 7 | .533 |
| Cornell | 2 | – | 6 | .250 | 6 | – | 6 | .500 |
| Harvard | 2 | – | 6 | .250 | 5 | – | 8 | .385 |

The 1902–03 Yale Bulldogs men's basketball team represented Yale University in intercollegiate basketball during the 1902–03 season. The team finished the season with a 15–1 record and was retroactively named the national champion by the Helms Athletic Foundation.
