= Charles Upson Clark =

American philologist (1875–1960)

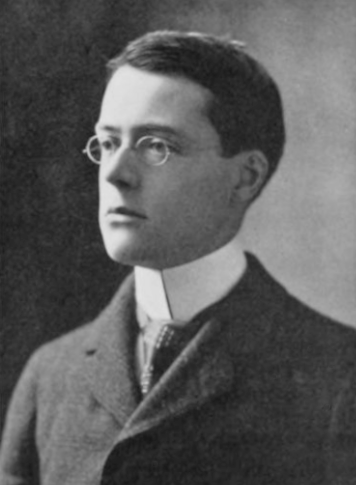
- Born: January 14, 1875; Springfield, Massachusetts, US
- Died: September 29, 1960 (aged 85); New York, New York, US
- Occupation: Historian
- Spouse: Annie White Frary (m. 1900)
- Children: 3

Charles Upson Clark (January 14, 1875 – September 29, 1960) was a professor of history at Columbia University. He discovered the Barberini Codex, the earliest Aztec writings on herbal medicines extant.

== Biography ==
Clark was born in Springfield, Massachusetts on January 14, 1875 to Edward Perkins Clark and Catharine Pickens Upson. He earned a bachelor's degree at Yale University in 1897, and a Ph.D. there in 1903.

He married Annie White Frary in Rome on September 7, 1900, and they had three children.

Throughout his life he was the author of many books on a variety of subjects. Among them was the history of West Indies by Antonio Vázquez de Espinosa translated into English, and the modern history of Romania.

He also collaborated with the American School of Classical Studies in Rome, where became a fellow in 1901, and held a directory of Classical Studies and Archaeology since 1910. He died at his apartment in New York City on September 29, 1960.

== Works ==
- The Text Tradition of Ammianus Marcellinus (1904)
- Collectanea Hispanica (1920)
- United Roumania (1922)
- Bessarabia, Russia and Roumania on the Black Sea (1927), Dodd, Mead and Company
- Voyageurs, robes noires, et coureurs de bois; Stories from the French exploration of North America (1934) (registration required)
