= John Kirkland Clark =

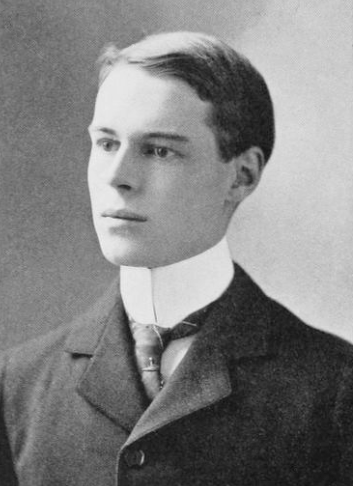
- Clark c. 1900

Biographical details
- Born: January 21, 1877; Springfield, Massachusetts, US
- Died: January 20, 1963 (aged 85); Charlemont, Massachusetts, US
- Education: Yale College

Playing career
- 1896–1899: Yale College
- 1901–1902: Harvard College
- 1902–1908: 17th Separate Company of Flushing New York
- 1909–1910: Poughkeepsie Bridge Jumpers of the Hudson River Basketball League
- Position: Guard

Coaching career (HC unless noted)
- 1901–1902: Harvard College

Head coaching record
- Overall: 20–13

John Kirkland Clark Sr. (January 21, 1877 – January 20, 1963) was an American lawyer, college basketball player and the first head coach of the Harvard College men's basketball team. Clark was a New York City assistant district attorney under Charles S. Whitman, the New York County District Attorney. In New York, Clark was appointed to investigate and prosecute cases of corruption. He was president of the New York State Board of Law Examiners from 1921 his retirement in 1943. Clark served as a member of the Loyalty Review Board established by U.S. President Harry S. Truman.

== Biography ==
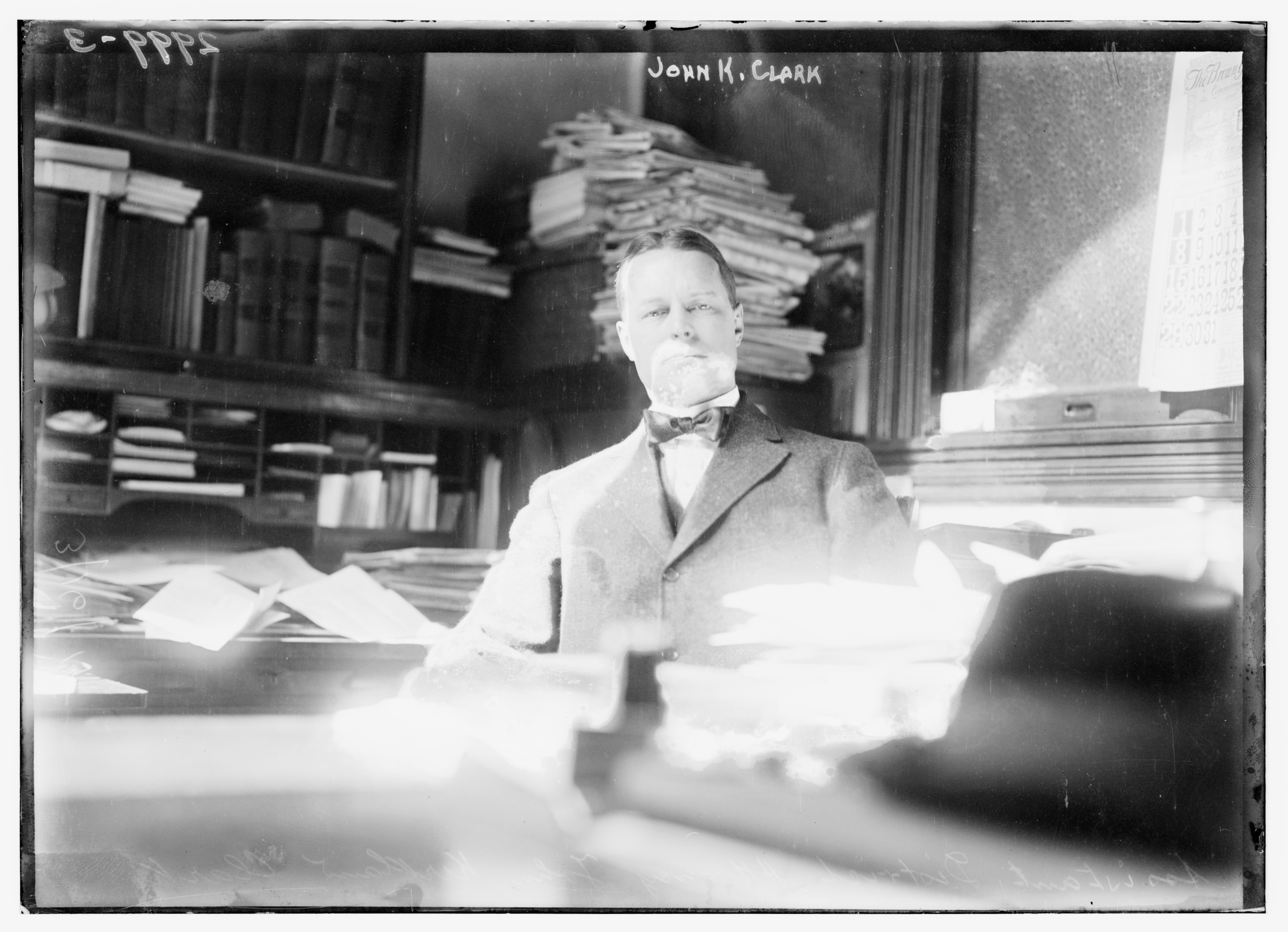
Clark in 1914

Clark was born on January 21, 1877, in Springfield, Massachusetts to Edward Perkins Clark editorial writer for the New York Evening Post and the writer Kate Upson Clark. Clark grew up in Springfield, Milwaukee, Washington DC and Philadelphia before his family settled in Brooklyn. Clark graduated from Yale College in 1899 and from Harvard Law School in 1902. Clark's brothers were Charles Upson Clark who discovered the Barberini Codex and George Maxwell, President of Clark & Gibby, Inc. of New York. He died on January 20, 1963.

== Basketball ==
Clark played three seasons for Yale College men's basketball from 1896 to 1899 as a 5'10" 160 lb Guard. While attending Harvard Law School, Clark brought basketball to the attention of the Harvard Athletics Department and served as the first head coach as well as player for the Harvard College men's basketball team for the 1901 and 1902 seasons. For the first Harvard Yale basketball game in 1901 Clark served as referee instead of a player because he was a Yale alum and his brother George Maxwell Clark was playing for Yale. Clark posted a 20–13 record at Harvard. Clark played independent basketball for the 17th Separate Company of Flushing New York from 1902 to 1908 and for the Poughkeepsie Bridge Jumpers for the Hudson River Basketball League 1909–1910.

== Selected works ==
- "Let the Maker Beware". St. John's Law Review. 19 (2): 85–94. April 1945.
- Preparation of Cross-Examination. Practising Law Institute. October 1953 – via HathiTrust.
