= 1902–03 Indiana Hoosiers men's basketball team =

American college basketball season

1902–03 Indiana Hoosiers men's basketball
- Conference: Independent
- Record: 8–4
- Head coach: Willis Koval (1st season)
- Captain: Harry Ayers
- Home arena: Old Assembly Hall

1902–03 Western Conference men's basketball standings
	Conf.				Overall
Team	W		L	PCT	W		L	PCT
Minnesota†*	1	–	0	1.000	13	–	0	1.000
Purdue	2	–	0	1.000	8	–	0	1.000
Wisconsin	0	–	1	.000	5	–	2	.714
Indiana	0	–	2	.000	8	–	4	.667
Iowa	0	–	0	–	4	–	3	.571
† Intramural play only, the conference did not have an official championship *Minnesota was named Premo-Porretta National Champions winner

The 1902–03 Indiana Hoosiers men's basketball team represented Indiana University. Their head coach was Willis Koval, who was in his first year. The team played its home games at the Old Assembly Hall in Bloomington, Indiana.

The Hoosiers finished the regular season with an overall record of 8–4.

== Roster ==
Name	Position	Year	Hometown
Harry Ayers	G	Sr.	Hartford City, Indiana
Guy Cantwell	G	Sr.	Spencer, Indiana
Zora Clevenger	G	Sr.	Muncie, Indiana
Thomas Cookson	F	So.	Anderson, Indiana
Chester Harmeson	F	Fr.	Anderson, Indiana
Clarence Hocker	F	So.	Beaver Dam, Kentucky
Leslie Maxwell	C	Fr.	Indianapolis, Indiana
Ralph Noel	G	So.	Star City, Indiana
Albert Penn	F	Fr.	Camden, Indiana
Roy Shackleton	G	Jr.	Chatterton, Indiana
William Stone	F	Sr.	Spencer, Indiana
Marvin Wallace	G	So.	Milton, Indiana

== Schedule ==
Date time, TV	Rank^{#}	Opponent^{#}	Result	Record	Site city, state
Regular season
1/14/1903*		Butler	W 28–16	1–0	Old Assembly Hall; Bloomington, IN
1/16/1903*		at Wabash	L 14–20	1–1	Crawfordsville, IN
1/17/1903*		at Crawfordsville Boys College	W 23–10	2–1	Crawfordsville, IN
1/20/1903*		DePauw	W 43–9	3–1	Old Assembly Hall; Bloomington, IN
1/24/1903*		Shortridge High School	W 23–18	4–1	Indianapolis, IN
1/30/1903*		at Purdue; Rivalry	L 16–52	4–2	Lafayette Coliseum; West Lafayette, IN
2/19/1903*		Wabash	L 12–19	4–3	Old Assembly Hall; Bloomington, IN
2/23/1903*		at Butler	W 35–23	5–3	Indianapolis, IN
2/27/1903*		at DePauw	W 54–21	6–3	Greencastle, IN
2/28/1903*		at Indiana State	W 32–16	7–3	North Hall; Terre Haute, IN
3/6/1903*		Purdue; Rivalry	L 14–17	7–4	Old Assembly Hall; Bloomington, IN
3/13/1903*		Indiana State	W 23–22	8–4	Old Assembly Hall; Bloomington, IN
*Non-conference game. ^{#}Rankings from AP Poll. (#) Tournament seedings in parentheses.
