= Joseph W. Gilles =

American college basketball player and coach

Biographical details
- Born: July 9, 1880; Oxford, Massachusetts, U.S.
- Died: January 30, 1913 (aged 32); Gary, Indiana, U.S.
- Education: Harvard College; Harvard Law School

Playing career
- 1900–1902: Harvard

Coaching career (HC unless noted)
- 1902–1904: Harvard

Head coaching record
- Overall: 6–15 (.286)

Joseph William Gilles (July 9, 1880 – January 30, 1913) was an American athlete who helped organize the Harvard Crimson men's basketball team.

== Biography ==
Gilles was born on July 9, 1880, in Oxford, Massachusetts, to John Joseph Herbert and Mary (Shea) Gilles. He grew up in Webster, Massachusetts and graduated from Webster High School in 1898. He attended Harvard College and helped organize the school's first basketball team. During the 1901–02 season, he was team captain and vice president of the New England Inter-Collegiate Basket Ball Association. He was the head coach during the 1902–03 and 1903–04 seasons. He graduated from Harvard College in 1902 and Harvard Law School in 1906.

After graduating from law school, Gilles moved to Pittsburgh and practiced with the firm of Way, Walker & Morris. In 1907, he moved to Gary, Indiana, where he had a solo practice. He died on January 30, 1913, in Gary.
