= Frank Sullivan (basketball) =

American basketball player and coach

Biographical details
- Born: June 3, 1951 (age 75)

Playing career
- 1970–1973: Westfield State

Coaching career (HC unless noted)
- 1974–1977: Villanova (assistant)
- 1977–1982: Lehigh (assistant)
- 1982–1984: Seton Hall (assistant)
- 1984–1991: Bentley
- 1991–2007: Harvard
- 2018–present: Newton Country Day School of the Sacred Heart

Frank Sullivan (born June 3, 1951) is an American former college men's basketball coach, currently serving as an Associate Commissioner at the America East Conference. The Lexington, Massachusetts native served as head coach at Bentley University from 1984 to 1991 and Harvard University from 1991 to 2007. He guided the Harvard Crimson to a 178–245 record over 16 seasons, never finishing higher than second in Ivy league play. On March 5, 2007, it was announced that he would not be returning as the coach of the Harvard Crimson for the 2007–2008 season. Sullivan is responsible for recruiting Houston Rockets point guard Jeremy Lin.

Sullivan amassed a record of 114–86 at Bentley University in seven seasons. Prior to his time at Bentley, he held assistant coaching roles at Villanova, Lehigh and Seton Hall. He played college basketball at Westfield State University.
