= 1902–03 Minnesota Golden Gophers men's basketball team =

American college basketball season

1902–03 Minnesota Golden Gophers men's basketball
- Conference: Big Ten Conference
- Record: 13–0 (1–0 Big Ten Conference)
- Head coach: L. J. Cooke (6th season)
- Home arena: UM Armory

1902–03 Western Conference men's basketball standings
	Conf.				Overall
Team	W		L	PCT	W		L	PCT
Minnesota†*	1	–	0	1.000	13	–	0	1.000
Purdue	2	–	0	1.000	8	–	0	1.000
Wisconsin	0	–	1	.000	5	–	2	.714
Indiana	0	–	2	.000	8	–	4	.667
Iowa	0	–	0	–	4	–	3	.571
† Intramural play only, the conference did not have an official championship *Minnesota was named Premo-Porretta National Champions winner

The 1902–03 Minnesota Golden Gophers men's basketball team represented the University of Minnesota in intercollegiate basketball during the 1902–03 season. The team finished the season with a 13–0 record and was retroactively listed as the top team of the season by the Premo-Porretta Power Poll.
