= 1902–03 Butler Christians men's basketball team =

American college basketball season

1902–03 Butler Christians men's basketball
- Conference: Independent
- Record: 1–3
- Head coach: Walter Kelly (4th season)

1901–02 collegiate men's basketball independents standings
| | Conf. | | | | Overall |
| Team | W | | L | PCT | W | | L | PCT |
|---|---|---|---|---|---|---|---|---|
| Amherst | | – | | – | 8 | – | 0 | 1.000 |
| Colorado Agricultural | | – | | – | 2 | – | 0 | 1.000 |
| Michigan State | | – | | – | 5 | – | 0 | 1.000 |
| New Mexico | | – | | – | 2 | – | 0 | 1.000 |
| Ripon | | – | | – | 4 | – | 0 | 1.000 |
| Washington | | – | | – | 7 | – | 0 | 1.000 |
| Wisc.–Stevens Point | | – | | – | 4 | – | 0 | 1.000 |
| St. Francis (NY) | | – | | – | 13 | – | 1 | .929 |
| Allegheny | | – | | – | 12 | – | 1 | .923 |
| Bucknell | | – | | – | 12 | – | 2 | .857 |
| St. Lawrence | | – | | – | 6 | – | 1 | .857 |
| Penn State | | – | | – | 9 | – | 2 | .818 |
| Grove City | | – | | – | 13 | – | 3 | .813 |
| Mount Union | | – | | – | 11 | – | 3 | .786 |
| Colgate | | – | | – | 7 | – | 2 | .778 |
| Penn | | – | | – | 7 | – | 2 | .778 |
| Williams | | – | | – | 13 | – | 4 | .765 |
| Colorado | | – | | – | 3 | – | 1 | .750 |
| Illinois State | | – | | – | 3 | – | 1 | .750 |
| Temple | | – | | – | 8 | – | 3 | .727 |
| Vanderbilt | | – | | – | 5 | – | 2 | .714 |
| Wheaton (Ill.) | | – | | – | 5 | – | 2 | .714 |
| Dartmouth | | – | | – | 11 | – | 5 | .688 |
| Lehigh | | – | | – | 9 | – | 5 | .643 |
| Geneva | | – | | – | 7 | – | 4 | .636 |
| Hiram | | – | | – | 7 | – | 4 | .636 |
| Nebraska | | – | | – | 5 | – | 3 | .625 |
| North Dakota Agricultural | | – | | – | 5 | – | 3 | .625 |
| Bloomsburg | | – | | – | 4 | – | 3 | .571 |
| Cincinnati | | – | | – | 5 | – | 4 | .556 |
| Akron | | – | | – | 2 | – | 2 | .500 |
| Connecticut | | – | | – | 5 | – | 5 | .500 |
| Grinnell | | – | | – | 2 | – | 2 | .500 |
| Lafayette | | – | | – | 5 | – | 5 | .500 |
| Syracuse | | – | | – | 3 | – | 3 | .500 |
| Wooster | | – | | – | 2 | – | 2 | .500 |
| Muhlenberg | | – | | – | 5 | – | 6 | .455 |
| Holy Cross | | – | | – | 4 | – | 5 | .444 |
| Wabash | | – | | – | 4 | – | 5 | .444 |
| Rensselaer | | – | | – | 3 | – | 4 | .429 |
| Kansas | | – | | – | 5 | – | 7 | .417 |
| Westminster (Pa.) | | – | | – | 3 | – | 5 | .375 |
| Augustana (Ill.) | | – | | – | 1 | – | 2 | .333 |
| Oregon Agricultural | | – | | – | 1 | – | 2 | .333 |
| Brown | | – | | – | 5 | – | 15 | .250 |
| Butler | | – | | – | 1 | – | 3 | .250 |
| Montana State | | – | | – | 1 | – | 4 | .200 |
| Indiana State | | – | | – | 1 | – | 6 | .143 |
| Washington State | | – | | – | 0 | – | 2 | .000 |
| Wesleyan (Conn.) | | – | | – | 0 | – | 4 | .000 |

The 1902–03 Butler Christians men's basketball team represented Butler University during the 1902–03 college men's basketball season. The head coach was Walter Kelly, coaching in his fourth season with the Christians.

== Schedule ==
| Date time, TV | Opponent | Result | Record | Site city, state |
|---|---|---|---|---|
| January 14, 1903* | at Indiana | L 16–28 | 0–1 | Old Assembly Hall; Bloomington, IN |
| February 23, 1903* | Indiana | L 23–35 | 0–2 | Indianapolis, IN |
*Non-conference game. (#) Tournament seedings in parentheses.
