= Haskell Indian Nations Fighting Indians =

Athletics department of Haskell Indian Nations University

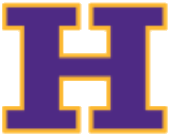
- University: Haskell Indian Nations University
- Conference: Continental (primary)
- NAIA: Region IV
- Athletic director: Zach Wilkerson
- Location: Lawrence, Kansas
- Varsity teams: 11
- Football stadium: Haskell Memorial Stadium
- Basketball arena: Tony Coffin Sports Complex
- Softball stadium: Haskell Softball Field
- Volleyball arena: Tony Coffin Sports Complex
- Nickname: Fighting Indians
- Fight song: Onward, Haskell!
- Colors: Purple, Gold, and White
- Website: haskellathletics.com

The Haskell Indian Nations Fighting Indians are the athletic teams that represent Haskell Indian Nations University, located in Lawrence, Kansas, in intercollegiate sports as a member of the National Association of Intercollegiate Athletics (NAIA), primarily competing as an NAIA independent within the Continental Athletic Conference since the 2015–16 academic year. The Fighting Indians previously competed in the defunct Midlands Collegiate Athletic Conference (MCAC) from 2001–02 to 2014–15 (when the conference dissolved).

== Varsity teams ==
HINU competes in 9 intercollegiate varsity sports:

Men's sports	Women's sports
Basketball	Basketball
Cross country	Cross country
Golf	Softball
Track and field^{1}	Track and field^{1}
	Volleyball
^{1} – includes both indoor and outdoor

=== Football ===
Haskell fielded their first football team in 1896. From the 1900s to the 1930s, Haskell’s football program was referred to as the “Powerhouse of the West,” playing teams such as Harvard, Yale, Brown, Missouri, Nebraska, Texas, Texas A&M, Oklahoma, Oklahoma A&M, Wisconsin and Minnesota. But in 1931, a new superintendent (R. D. Baldwin) made the decision to shift the college football team to high school status following the 1931 season. With fewer teams available to play, Haskell dropped football after the 1938 season. Football at Haskell would not be resumed again until 1990.

Due to funding shortfalls, Haskell suspended football for the 2015 season.

=== Men's basketball ===
Men's basketball at Haskell has brought nationwide attention with its ability to bring Native American talent to the basketball court.

=== Women's basketball ===
Women's basketball at Haskell Indian Nations University has made several post-season appearances including the Indian College National Basketball Tournament.

== Facilities ==
Haskell's athletics facilities include:

Venue	Sport(s)	Capac.	Opened
Haskell Memorial Stadium	Soccer	5,000	1926
Tony Coffin Sports Complex	Basketball	2,000	
Tony Coffin Sports Complex	Volleyball	2,000	

== Fight song ==
Haskell Indian Nations Fighting Indians fight song is named Onward Haskell.

== See also ==
- Native American mascot controversy
