= Cheyenne Business College =

Defunct trade school in Cheyenne, Wyoming

Coordinates: 41°08′02″N 104°48′53″W

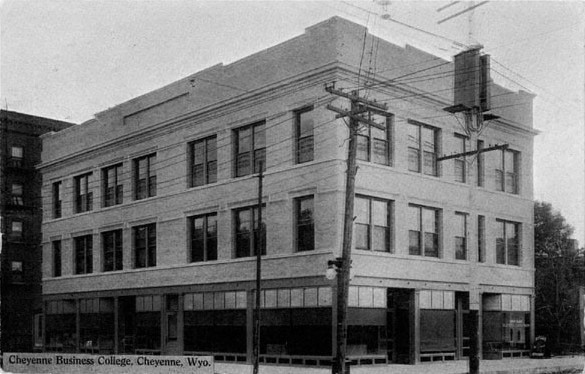
A postcard advertising the school in the early 20th century

Cheyenne Business College was a trade school in Cheyenne, Wyoming that existed in the early 20th century.

== History ==
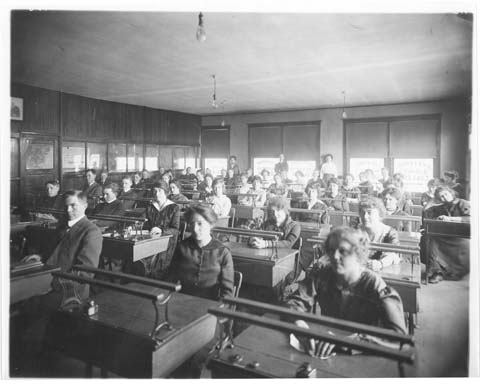
A class in the Deming Building's third floor in 1915

According to the Casper Morning Star, Cheyenne Business College was incorporated in the early 1890s. A biography of founder Daniel C. Royer says he first established the college in 1896, abandoned it to take classes at another institution, then re-established the college circa 1901.

A 1903 U.S. Office of Education report listed Cheyenne Business College as having two instructors and 72 students, with Royer as the college's executive officer.

On May 24, 1930, A. W. Johnston School of Business in Billings, Montana announced that they had purchased Cheyenne Business College to run as a second school, according to The Billings Gazette.

According to a 1994 almanac, the college closed in the 1930s in the wake of the Great Depression.

== Basketball ==
Cheyenne Business College had a men's basketball team at least as early as 1903. According to newspapers from the time, the Cheyenne team held the championship of Nebraska, Colorado, and Wyoming in 1903 and 1904.

In November 1904, John Nolan, who played as center for Cheyenne, died in a train accident.

On January 18, 1907, Cheyenne defeated the visiting Wyoming Cowboys by a score of 72–16, which remains the largest margin of defeat in University of Wyoming history as of 2019. Wyoming's media guide lists 1 win and 6 losses to Cheyenne Business College between the 1906–07 season and the 1909–10 season.

=== Game log ===
Date	Site	Team	Result	Score
1903-02-07	H	Nebraska	W	42–28
1906-01-25		Colorado	L	23–30
1907-01-18	H	Wyoming	W	72–16
1907-02-17	A	Wyoming	W	39–11
1909-02-16	H	Wyoming	W	26–11
1909-02-22	A	Wyoming	L	17–26
1910-02-10	A	Wyoming	W	38–18
1910-02-11	H	Wyoming	W	43–30

Source: Opponents' media guides

== Location ==
Cheyenne Business College was located in the Deming Building in downtown Cheyenne. The Deming Building was built in 1911 and is located at 1620 Central Ave. The building is still standing today and a faded sign for the college is still visible on one side of the building.
