= Ensign College =

College operated by the LDS Church

Coordinates: 40.771187°N 111.899177°W

- Former names: Salt Lake Stake Academy (1886–1890); LDS College (1890–1901); LDS University (1901–1927); LDS College (1927–1931); LDS Business College (1931–2020)
- Type: Private college
- Established: November 15, 1886; 139 years ago
- Parent institution: Church Educational System
- Accreditation: NWCCU
- Religious affiliation: The Church of Jesus Christ of Latter-day Saints
- President: Bruce C. Kusch
- Academic staff: 20 faculty, 213 adjunct faculty (Fall 2023)
- Students: 5,973 (Fall 2023)
- Location: Salt Lake City, Utah, United States
- Campus: Urban, 10-story building, 151,582 square feet (14,082.4 m^{2})
- Colors: Ensign green, light green, yellow
- Mascot: Lion
- Website: Ensign.edu

Ensign College is a private college in Salt Lake City, Utah, United States. Founded in 1886, the college is owned by the Church of Jesus Christ of Latter-day Saints, and operates under its Church Educational System. It also includes an institute of religion and is accredited by the Northwest Commission on Colleges and Universities.

== History ==
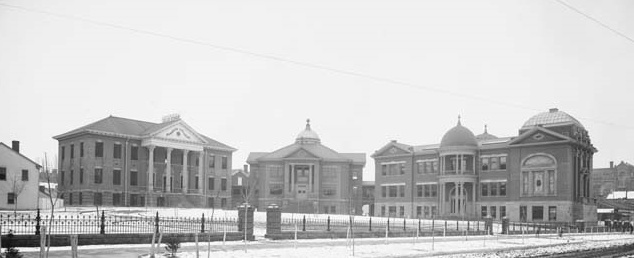
Latter-day Saints' University in 1905

The Salt Lake Stake Academy was founded in 1886, with high school, normal, business and college courses of study. The school had eighty-four students upon its opening. The first classes were held in the Social Hall. By 1895 was offering a four-year course of study culminating in a PhB degree.

LDS University never became a fully functioning university and was displaced as the church's preeminent higher learning center by Brigham Young University in the early twentieth century. The college was closely linked with Latter-day Saints High School, which counted George W. Romney (1926) and Gordon B. Hinckley (1928) among its graduates.

In 1927, the name of LDS University was changed to LDS College and then to LDS Business College (LDSBC), as its other higher-education functions were gone. Two of the school's presidents were James E. Talmage and Bryant S. Hinckley.

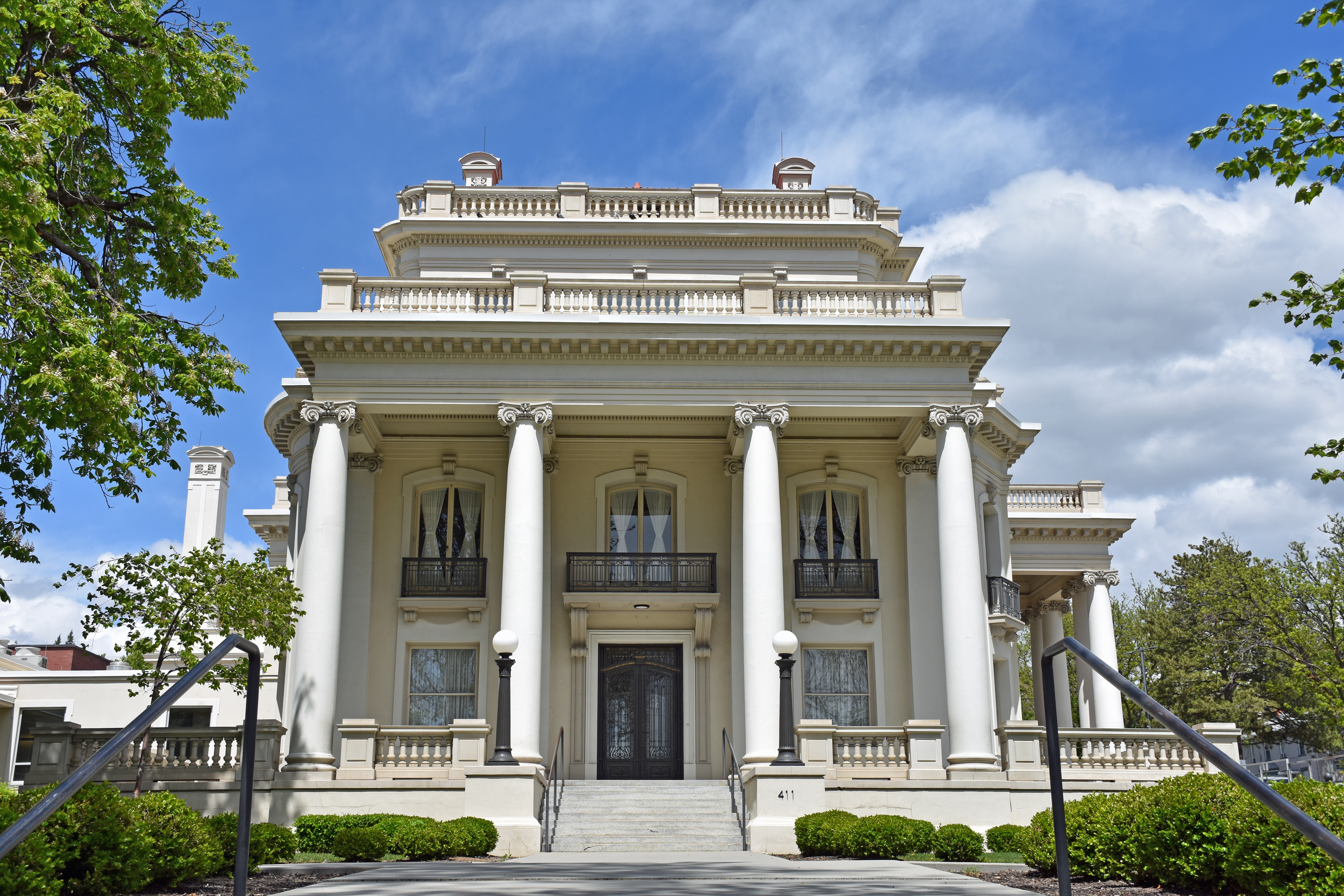
The Enos Wall Mansion, home of the college from 1962 to 2006

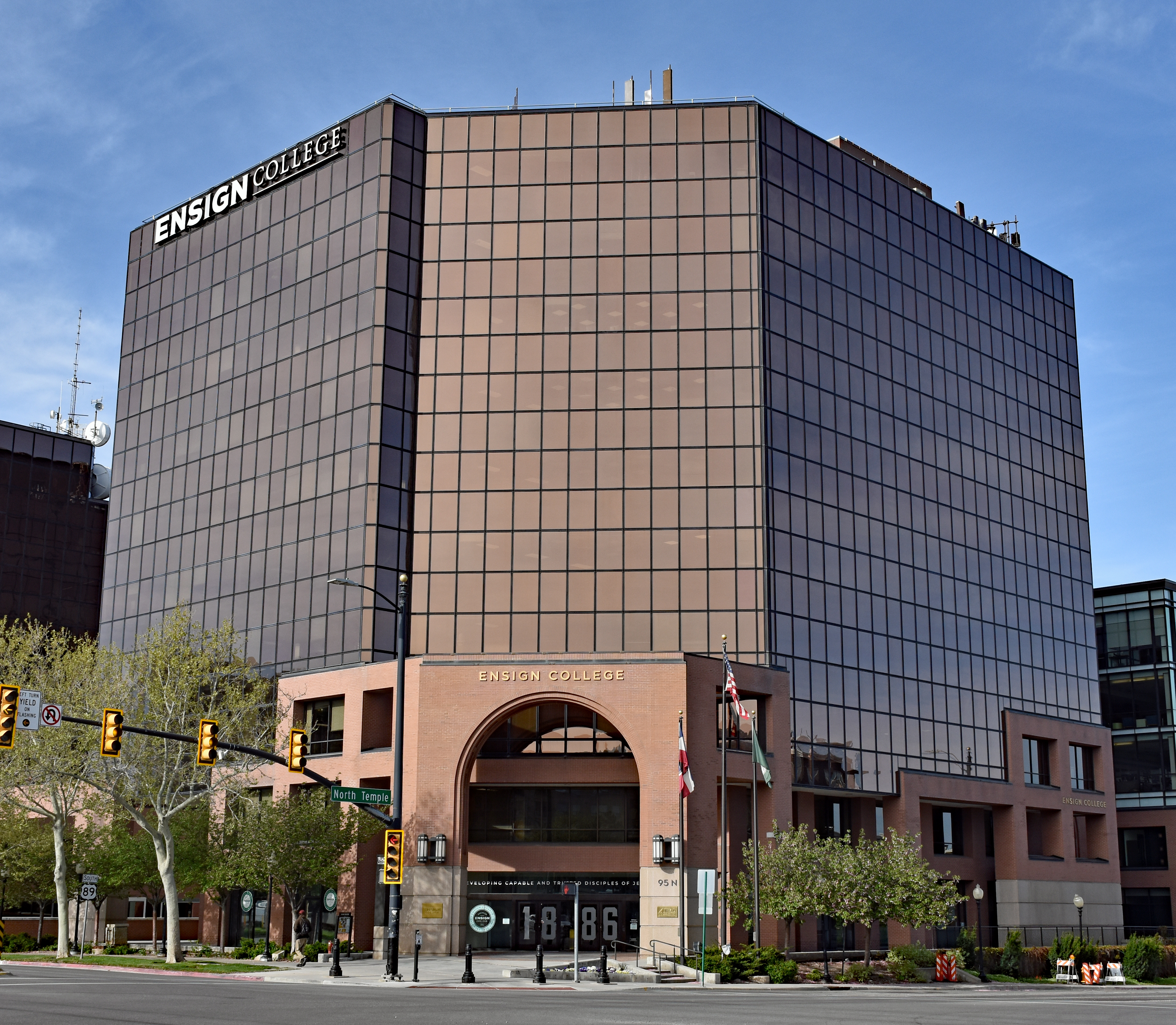
4 Triad Center, home of the college since 2006

For many years, the college was located in a former mansion several blocks east of the Salt Lake Temple, at 411 East South Temple. As part of the church's efforts to revitalize downtown Salt Lake City, it moved to the Triad Center in 2006.

Russell M. Nelson, the church's 17th president, initially took classes at LDSBC but later transferred to the University of Utah to complete his studies.

The college is named after Ensign Peak, where Latter-day Saint immigrants waved a flag two days after their first arrival in the Valley of the Great Salt Lake in 1847. The college's slogan is "developing capable and trusted disciples of Jesus Christ."

On September 1, 2020, LDSBC was renamed Ensign College. In the fall of 2021, Ensign College began offering four-year bachelor of applied science degrees in business management, information technology, and communications.

== List of presidents ==
The following is a list of presidents of the institution:

- Karl G. Maeser (principal in charge): 1886–88;
- Willard Done (acting principal): 1886–88;
- James E. Talmage: 1888–92;
- Willard Done: 1892–99;
- Joshua H. Paul: 1899–1905;
- Willard Young: 1905–15;
- Guy C. Wilson: 1915–26;
- Feramorz Y. Fox: 1926–48;
- Kenneth S. Bennion: 1948–61;
- R. Ferris Kirkham: 1961–86;
- Kenneth H. Beesley: 1986–91;
- Stephen K. Woodhouse: 1992–2008;
- J. Lawrence Richards: 2008–17;
- Bruce C. Kusch: 2017–present

== See also ==
- List of colleges and universities in Utah
- LDS Philanthropies

== Bibliography ==
- Beesley, K. H. (1992). LDS Business College. In D. H. Ludlow (Ed.), Encyclopedia of Mormonism. New York: Macmillan.
