= Muhlenberg Mules =

Athletic teams of Muhlenberg College

- University: Muhlenberg College
- Association: NCAA Division III
- Conference: Centennial Conference or Eastern College Athletic Conference
- Athletic director: Lynn Tubman
- Location: Allentown, Pennsylvania, U.S.
- Varsity teams: 22
- Football stadium: Scotty Wood Stadium
- Basketball arena: Memorial Hall
- Other venues: John Deitrich Field House
- Mascot: The Mule
- Nickname: Mules
- Colors: Red and gray
- Website: muhlenbergsports.com
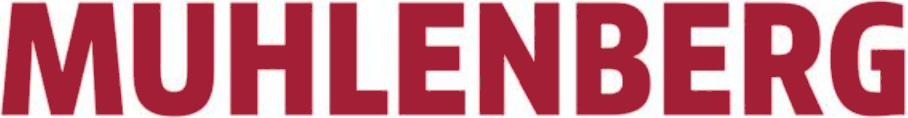

The Muhlenberg Mules are the collegiate athletic teams of Muhlenberg College in Allentown, Pennsylvania. The college competes in NCAA Division III of the National Collegiate Athletic Association (NCAA). Muhlenberg has 22 intercollegiate sports, including ten for women and ten for men. Each team competes in either the Centennial Conference or Eastern College Athletic Conference.

Both men's and women's teams exist for basketball, cross country, golf, lacrosse, soccer, tennis, and track and field. Men's teams exist for baseball, football, and wrestling; women have teams for field hockey, softball, and volleyball. In the 2024-25 academic year, the Mules intend to add wrestling as an eleventh women's sport at the college.

== Varsity sports ==
Men's sports	Women's sports
Baseball	Basketball
Basketball	Cross country
Cross country	Field hockey
Football	Golf
Golf	Lacrosse
Lacrosse	Soccer
Soccer	Softball
Tennis	Tennis
Track and field	Track and field
Wrestling	Volleyball
	Wrestling

=== Football ===
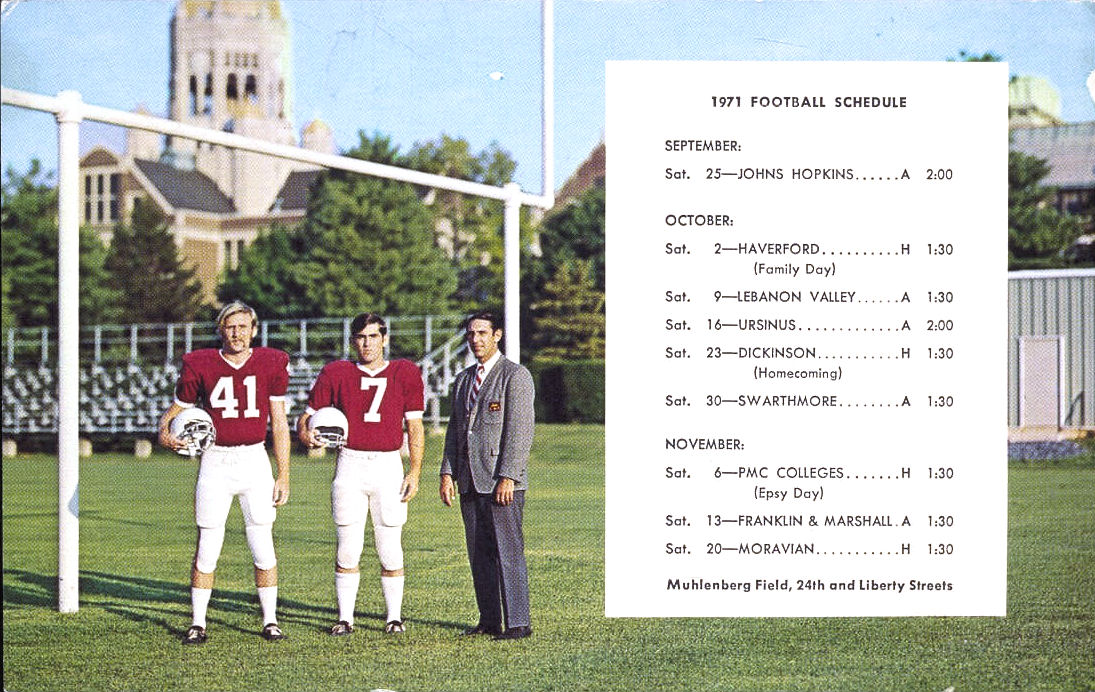
Muhlenberg Mules football players in 1971

Since the start of the Muhlenberg football program in 1900, at least three Muhlenberg players have gone on to play in the National Football League:

- Sisto Averno, 1950 to 1954 with the Baltimore Colts, Dallas Texans, and New York Yanks
- Charlie Copley, 1920 to 1922 with the Akron Pros and Milwaukee Badgers
- Tony Zuzzio, 1942, Detroit Lions

== Club teams ==
In addition to its 19 NCAA teams, Muhlenberg has sports club teams in ultimate frisbee and women's rugby.

== Facilities ==
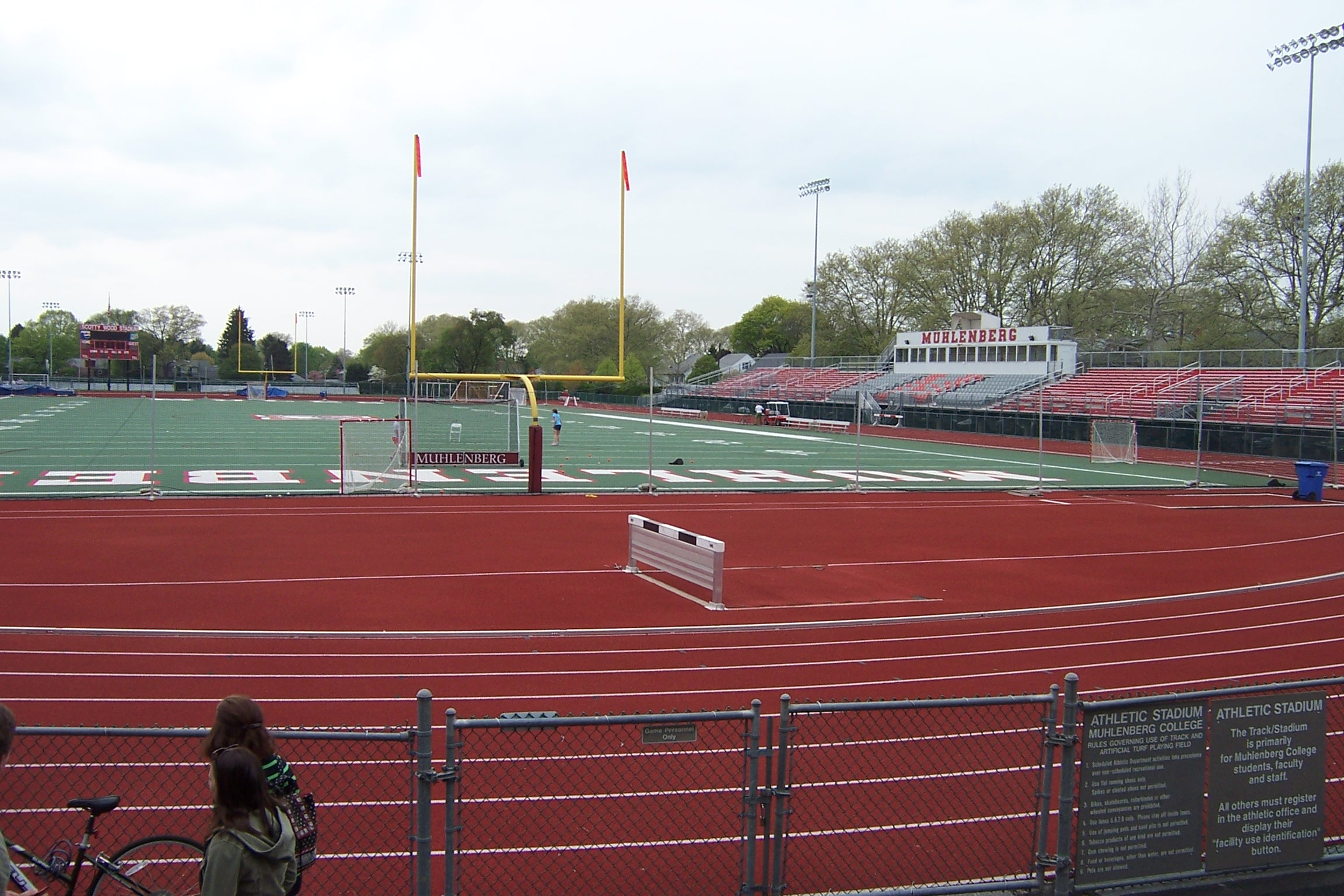
Scotty Wood Stadium, Muhlenberg College's on-campus outdoor sports venue

The football, field hockey, and track and field teams each play their home games at Scotty Wood Stadium, a 3,000-capacity stadium built in 1999 on the Muhlenberg College campus at 3400 West Chew Street. The basketball, wrestling, and volleyball teams hold their games and matches at Memorial Hall, an indoor arena located on the campus at 2346 Liberty Street.

Additional athletic facilities were built west of the field house in 1999. Updated tennis courts were built in 2003, and two fields were added in 1997 and 1998. The baseball and softball teams do not have on-campus facilities.
