= 1900–01 collegiate men's basketball season in the United States =

American college basketball season

- Helms National Champions: Yale (retroactive selection in 1943)

The 1900–01 collegiate men's basketball season in the United States began in December 1900, progressed through the regular season, and concluded in March 1901.

== Rule changes ==
Beginning in 1900–01, a dribbler could dribble only once, had to use both hands to dribble, and could not shoot for a field goal. Previously, a player in possession of the ball had been permitted only to pass it to another player.

== Season headlines ==
- In February 1943, the Helms Athletic Foundation retroactively selected Yale as its national champion for the 1900–01 season.
- In 1995, the Premo-Porretta Power Poll retroactively selected Bucknell as its top-ranked team for the 1900–01 season.

== Regular season ==
During the season, college teams played against non-collegiate opponents such as athletic clubs, high schools, and Young Men's Christian Association (YMCA) teams as well as against other colleges and universities.

=== Conference play ===
The Western Conference (the future Big Ten Conference) was the only college basketball conference. It did not sponsor an official conference season or recognize a regular-season champion until the 1905–06 season, although a few intramural games between conference members took place during the 1900–01 season. Among conference members which played more than 10 games, Purdue (12–0) went undefeated, and Minnesota finished with a record of 11–1.

1900–01 Western Conference men's basketball standings
	Conf.				Overall
Team	W		L	PCT	W		L	PCT
Purdue†	2	–	0	1.000	12	–	0	1.000
Minnesota	1	–	0	1.000	11	–	1	.917
Wisconsin	0	–	1	.000	1	–	1	.500
Indiana	0	–	2	.000	1	–	4	.200
† Intramural play only; the conference did not have an official championship winner

=== Independents ===
A total of 41 college teams played as major independents during the 1900–01 season. Among independents that played more than 10 games, Bucknell (12–1) and Allegheny (14–2) posted the best records.

1900–01 collegiate men's basketball independents standings
	Conf.				Overall
Team	W		L	PCT	W		L	PCT
Amherst		–		–	4	–	0	1.000
Connecticut		–		–	1	–	0	1.000
Michigan State		–		–	3	–	0	1.000
Washington		–		–	1	–	0	1.000
Bucknell		–		–	12	–	1	.923
Allegheny		–		–	14	–	2	.875
Geneva		–		–	10	–	2	.833
Penn State		–		–	5	–	1	.833
Hiram		–		–	9	–	2	.818
Williams		–		–	9	–	2	.818
Illinois State		–		–	4	–	1	.800
North Dakota Agricultural		–		–	4	–	1	.800
Wisconsin–Superior		–		–	8	–	2	.800
Butler		–		–	2	–	1	.667
Western Reserve		–		–	5	–	3	.625
Mount Union		–		–	10	–	6	.625
Yale		–		–	10	–	2	.833
Princeton		–		–	7	–	5	.583
Dartmouth		–		–	11	–	8	.579
Harvard		–		–	11	–	8	.579
Grinnell		–		–	4	–	3	.571
Lafayette		–		–	4	–	3	.571
Holy Cross		–		–	6	–	6	.500
Muhlenberg		–		–	4	–	3	.571
Nebraska		–		–	3	–	3	.500
Rensselaer		–		–	4	–	4	.500
Syracuse		–		–	2	–	2	.500
Vanderbilt		–		–	2	–	2	.500
Wisconsin–Stevens Point		–		–	4	–	4	.500
Brown		–		–	3	–	4	.429
Colgate		–		–	5	–	8	.385
Cornell		–		–	2	–	4	.333
Kansas		–		–	4	–	8	.333
Westminster (Pa.)		–		–	2	–	5	.286
Ohio State		–		–	1	–	3	.250
Columbia		–		–	1	–	4	.200
Grove City		–		–	2	–	8	.200
Gettysburg		–		–	1	–	5	.167
Wabash		–		–	2	–	10	.167
Indiana State		–		–	0	–	4	.000
Wooster		–		–	0	–	2	.000
