= 1900–01 Kansas Jayhawks men's basketball team =

American college basketball season

1900–01 Kansas Jayhawks men's basketball
- Conference: Independent
- Record: 4–8
- Head coach: James Naismith (3rd season)
- Captain: Frederick Owens
- Home arena: Snow Hall

1900–01 collegiate men's basketball independents standings
	Conf.				Overall
Team	W		L	PCT	W		L	PCT
Amherst		–		–	4	–	0	1.000
Connecticut		–		–	1	–	0	1.000
Michigan State		–		–	3	–	0	1.000
Washington		–		–	1	–	0	1.000
Bucknell		–		–	12	–	1	.923
Allegheny		–		–	14	–	2	.875
Geneva		–		–	10	–	2	.833
Penn State		–		–	5	–	1	.833
Hiram		–		–	9	–	2	.818
Williams		–		–	9	–	2	.818
Illinois State		–		–	4	–	1	.800
North Dakota Agricultural		–		–	4	–	1	.800
Wisconsin–Superior		–		–	8	–	2	.800
Butler		–		–	2	–	1	.667
Western Reserve		–		–	5	–	3	.625
Mount Union		–		–	10	–	6	.625
Yale		–		–	10	–	2	.833
Princeton		–		–	7	–	5	.583
Dartmouth		–		–	11	–	8	.579
Harvard		–		–	11	–	8	.579
Grinnell		–		–	4	–	3	.571
Lafayette		–		–	4	–	3	.571
Holy Cross		–		–	6	–	6	.500
Muhlenberg		–		–	4	–	3	.571
Nebraska		–		–	3	–	3	.500
Rensselaer		–		–	4	–	4	.500
Syracuse		–		–	2	–	2	.500
Vanderbilt		–		–	2	–	2	.500
Wisconsin–Stevens Point		–		–	4	–	4	.500
Brown		–		–	3	–	4	.429
Colgate		–		–	5	–	8	.385
Cornell		–		–	2	–	4	.333
Kansas		–		–	4	–	8	.333
Westminster (Pa.)		–		–	2	–	5	.286
Ohio State		–		–	1	–	3	.250
Columbia		–		–	1	–	4	.200
Grove City		–		–	2	–	8	.200
Gettysburg		–		–	1	–	5	.167
Wabash		–		–	2	–	10	.167
Indiana State		–		–	0	–	4	.000
Wooster		–		–	0	–	2	.000

The 1900–01 Kansas Jayhawks men's basketball team represented the University of Kansas in its third season of collegiate basketball. The head coach was James Naismith, the inventor of the game, who served his 3rd year. The Jayhawks finished the season 4–8.

== Roster ==
- Clyde Allphin
- Frederick Owens
- Ernest Quigley
- Chester Smith

== Schedule ==
Date time, TV	Opponent	Result	Record	Site city, state
Dec. 11, 1900*	at William Jewell	L 6–8	0–1	Liberty, Missouri
Dec. 22, 1900*	at Ajax AC	L 0–2‡	0–2	Newton, Kansas
Jan. 24, 1901*	Haskell	L 22–40	0–3	Lawrence, Kansas
Jan. 31, 1901*	at Independence	L 8–11	0–4	Independence, Missouri
Feb. 01, 1901*	at Independence	L 13–29	0–5	Independence, Missouri
Feb. 8, 1901*	at Topeka YMCA	L 7–14	0–6	Topeka, Kansas
Feb. 15, 1901*	Lawrence YMCA	W 28–12	1–6	Lawrence, Kansas
Feb. 22, 1901*	at Haskell	L 12–18	1–7	Lawrence, Kansas
Mar. 1, 1901*	Topeka YMCA	L 21–23	1–8	Lawrence, Kansas
Mar. 4, 1901*	at Ottawa YMCA	W 14–8	2–8	Ottawa, Kansas
Mar. 8, 1901*	Lawrence YMCA	W 29–20	3–8	Lawrence, Kansas
Mar. 9, 1901*	Haskell	W 25–20	4–8	Lawrence, Kansas
*Non-conference game. ^{#}Rankings from AP Poll. (#) Tournament seedings in parentheses. All times are in Central Standard Time.

‡ – KU walked off the court and forfeited the game following a dispute over the rules.
