= 1900–01 Butler Christians men's basketball team =

American college basketball season

1900–01 Butler Bulldogs men's basketball
- Conference: Independent
- Record: 2–1
- Head coach: Walter Kelly (2nd season)

1900–01 collegiate men's basketball independents standings
	Conf.				Overall
Team	W		L	PCT	W		L	PCT
Amherst		–		–	4	–	0	1.000
Connecticut		–		–	1	–	0	1.000
Michigan State		–		–	3	–	0	1.000
Washington		–		–	1	–	0	1.000
Bucknell		–		–	12	–	1	.923
Allegheny		–		–	14	–	2	.875
Geneva		–		–	10	–	2	.833
Penn State		–		–	5	–	1	.833
Hiram		–		–	9	–	2	.818
Williams		–		–	9	–	2	.818
Illinois State		–		–	4	–	1	.800
North Dakota Agricultural		–		–	4	–	1	.800
Wisconsin–Superior		–		–	8	–	2	.800
Butler		–		–	2	–	1	.667
Western Reserve		–		–	5	–	3	.625
Mount Union		–		–	10	–	6	.625
Yale		–		–	10	–	2	.833
Princeton		–		–	7	–	5	.583
Dartmouth		–		–	11	–	8	.579
Harvard		–		–	11	–	8	.579
Grinnell		–		–	4	–	3	.571
Lafayette		–		–	4	–	3	.571
Holy Cross		–		–	6	–	6	.500
Muhlenberg		–		–	4	–	3	.571
Nebraska		–		–	3	–	3	.500
Rensselaer		–		–	4	–	4	.500
Syracuse		–		–	2	–	2	.500
Vanderbilt		–		–	2	–	2	.500
Wisconsin–Stevens Point		–		–	4	–	4	.500
Brown		–		–	3	–	4	.429
Colgate		–		–	5	–	8	.385
Cornell		–		–	2	–	4	.333
Kansas		–		–	4	–	8	.333
Westminster (Pa.)		–		–	2	–	5	.286
Ohio State		–		–	1	–	3	.250
Columbia		–		–	1	–	4	.200
Grove City		–		–	2	–	8	.200
Gettysburg		–		–	1	–	5	.167
Wabash		–		–	2	–	10	.167
Indiana State		–		–	0	–	4	.000
Wooster		–		–	0	–	2	.000

The 1900–01 Butler Christians men's basketball team represented Butler University during the 1900–01 college men's basketball season. The head coach was Walter Kelly, coaching in his second season with the Christians.

== Schedule ==
Date time, TV	Opponent	Result	Record	Site city, state
February 8, 1901*	Indiana	W 20–17	1–0	Indianapolis, IN
February 21, 1901*	at Indiana	W 24–20	2–0	Old Assembly Hall; Bloomington, IN
March 21, 1901*	Purdue	L 12–41	2–1	Indianapolis, IN
*Non-conference game. (#) Tournament seedings in parentheses.
