= List of Purdue Boilermakers men's basketball seasons =

This is a list of the seasons completed by the Purdue Boilermakers men's basketball. There have been 19 different Head Coaches for the Boilermakers.

== Season-by-season results ==
Record table
Season	Team	Overall	Conference	Standing	Postseason
F. Homer Curtis (Independent) (1896–1897)
1896–97	F. Homer Curtis	1–1			
F. Homer Curtis:		1–1			
Alpha Jamison (Independent) (1899–1901)
1899–1900	Alpha Jamison	0–1			
1900–01	Alpha Jamison	12–0			
Alpha Jamison:		12–1			
C.M. Best (Independent) (1901–1902)
1901–02	C.M. Best	10–3			
C.M. Best:		10–3			
C.I. Freeman (Independent) (1902–1903)
1902–03	C.I. Freeman	8–0			
C.I. Freeman:		8–0			
John Snack (Independent) (1903–1904)
1903–04	John Snack	11–2			
John Snack:		11–2			
James Nufer (Independent) (1904–1905)
1904–05	James Nufer	3–6			
James Nufer:		3–6			
C.B. Jamison (Big Ten Conference) (1905–1908)
1905–06	C.B. Jamison	4–7	3–6	6th	
1906–07	C.B. Jamison	7–8	2–6	4th	
1907–08	C.B. Jamison	5–9	0–8	5th	
C.B. Jamison:		16–24	5–20		
E.J. Stewart (Big Ten Conference) (1908–1909)
1908–09	E.J. Stewart	8–4	6–4	2nd	
E.J. Stewart:		8–4	6–4		
Ralph Jones (Big Ten Conference) (1909–1912)
1909–10	Ralph Jones	8–5	5–5	6th	
1910–11	Ralph Jones	12–4	8–4	T–1st	
1911–12	Ralph Jones	12–0	10–0	T–1st	
Ralph Jones:		32–9	23–9		
R.E. Vaughn (Big Ten Conference) (1912–1916)
1912–13	R.E. Vaughn	7–5	6–5	3rd	
1913–14	R.E. Vaughn	5–9	3–9	7th	
1914–15	R.E. Vaughn	5–8	4–8	6th	
1915–16	R.E. Vaughn	4–10	2–10	9th	
R.E. Vaughn:		21–32	15–32		
Ward "Piggy" Lambert (Big Ten Conference) (1916–1917)
1916–17	Ward Lambert	11–3	7–2	3rd	
J.J. Maloney (Big Ten Conference) (1917–1918)
1917–18	J.J. Maloney	11–5	5–5	T–5th	
J.J. Maloney:		11–5	5–5		
Ward "Piggy" Lambert (Big Ten Conference) (1918–1946)
1918–19	Ward Lambert	6–8	4–7	T–7th	
1919–20	Ward Lambert	16–4	8–2	2nd	
1920–21	Ward Lambert	13–7	8–4	T–1st	
1921–22	Ward Lambert	15–3	8–1	1st	
1922–23	Ward Lambert	9–6	7–5	T–4th	
1923–24	Ward Lambert	12–5	7–5	T–5th	
1924–25	Ward Lambert	9–5	7–4	3rd	
1925–26	Ward Lambert	13–4	8–4	T–1st	
1926–27	Ward Lambert	12–5	9–3	T–2nd	
1927–28	Ward Lambert	15–2	10–2	T–1st	
1928–29	Ward Lambert	13–4	8–4	2nd	
1929–30	Ward Lambert	13–2	10–0	1st	
1930–31	Ward Lambert	12–5	8–4	T–2nd	
1931–32	Ward Lambert	17–1	11–1	1st	Helms Athletic Foundation National Champion
1932–33	Ward Lambert	11–7	6–6	T–5th	
1933–34	Ward Lambert	17–3	10–2	1st	
1934–35	Ward Lambert	17–3	9–3	T–1st	
1935–36	Ward Lambert	16–4	11–1	T–1st	
1936–37	Ward Lambert	15–5	8–4	4th	
1937–38	Ward Lambert	18–2	10–2	1st	
1938–39	Ward Lambert	12–7	6–6	5th	
1939–40	Ward Lambert	16–4	10–2	1st	
1940–41	Ward Lambert	13–7	6–6	5th	
1941–42	Ward Lambert	14–7	9–6	T–6th	
1942–43	Ward Lambert	9–11	6–6	T–4th	
1943–44	Ward Lambert	11–10	4–8	T–5th	
1944–45	Ward Lambert	9–11	6–6	4th	
1945–46	Ward Lambert	7–7	1–4	8th	
Ward Lambert:		371–152	228–110		
Mel Taube (Big Ten Conference) (1946–1950)
1945–46	Mel Taube	3–4	3–4	8th	
1946–47	Mel Taube	9–11	4–8	8th	
1947–48	Mel Taube	11–9	6–6	5th	
1948–49	Mel Taube	13–9	6–6	T–4th	
1949–50	Mel Taube	9–13	3–9	T–8th	
Mel Taube:		45–46	21–33		
Ray Eddy (Big Ten Conference) (1950–1965)
1950–51	Ray Eddy	8–14	4–8	8th	
1951–52	Ray Eddy	8–14	3–11	10th	
1952–53	Ray Eddy	4–18	3–15	T–9th	
1953–54	Ray Eddy	9–13	3–11	T–9th	
1954–55	Ray Eddy	12–10	5–9	T–6th	
1955–56	Ray Eddy	16–6	9–5	T–3rd	
1956–57	Ray Eddy	15–7	8–6	T–5th	
1957–58	Ray Eddy	14–8	9–5	T–2nd	
1958–59	Ray Eddy	15–7	8–6	T–2nd	
1959–60	Ray Eddy	11–12	6–8	T–6th	
1960–61	Ray Eddy	16–7	10–4	T–2nd	
1961–62	Ray Eddy	17–7	9–5	3rd	
1962–63	Ray Eddy	7–17	2–12	10th	
1963–64	Ray Eddy	12–12	8–6	T–4th	
1964–65	Ray Eddy	12–12	5–9	7th	
Ray Eddy:		176–164	92–122		
George King (Big Ten Conference) (1965–1972)
1965–66	George King	8–16	4–10	T–9th	
1966–67	George King	15–9	7–7	T–5th	
1967–68	George King	15–9	9–5	3rd	
1968–69	George King	23–5	13–1	1st	NCAA University Division Runner-up
1969–70	George King	18–6	11–3	2nd	
1970–71	George King	18–7	11–3	3rd	NIT first round
1971–72	George King	12–12	6–8	T–5th	
George King:		109–64	61–37		
Fred Schaus (Big Ten Conference) (1972–1978)
1972–73	Fred Schaus	15–9	8–6	T–3rd	
1973–74	Fred Schaus	21–9	10–4	3rd	NIT Champion
1974–75	Fred Schaus	17–11	11–7	T–3rd	NCIT Semifinal
1975–76	Fred Schaus	16–11	11–7	3rd	
1976–77	Fred Schaus	20–8	14–4	2nd	NCAA Division I first round
1977–78	Fred Schaus	16–11	11–7	T–4th	
Fred Schaus:		105–59	65–35		
Lee Rose (Big Ten Conference) (1978–1980)
1978–79	Lee Rose	27–8	13–5	T–1st	NIT Runner-up
1979–80	Lee Rose	23–10	11–7	3rd	NCAA Division I Final Four
Lee Rose:		50–18	24–12		
Gene Keady (Big Ten Conference) (1980–2005)
1980–81	Gene Keady	21–11	10–8	4th	NIT Third Place
1981–82	Gene Keady	18–14	11–7	5th	NIT Runner-up
1982–83	Gene Keady	21–9	11–7	T–2nd	NCAA Division I second round
1983–84	Gene Keady	22–7	15–3	T–1st	NCAA Division I second round
1984–85	Gene Keady	20–9	11–7	3rd	NCAA Division I first round
1985–86	Gene Keady	22–10	11–7	T–4th	NCAA Division I first round
1986–87	Gene Keady	25–5	15–3	T–1st	NCAA Division I second round
1987–88	Gene Keady	29–4	16–2	1st	NCAA Division I Sweet Sixteen
1988–89	Gene Keady	15–16	8–10	T–6th	
1989–90	Gene Keady	22–8	13–5	2nd	NCAA Division I second round
1990–91	Gene Keady	17–12	9–9	T–5th	NCAA Division I first round
1991–92	Gene Keady	18–15	8–10	T–6th	NIT Quarterfinal
1992–93	Gene Keady	18–10	9–9	T–5th	NCAA Division I first round
1993–94	Gene Keady	29–5	14–4	1st	NCAA Division I Elite Eight
1994–95	Gene Keady	25–7	15–3	1st	NCAA Division I second round
1995–96	Gene Keady	26–6^{[Note A]}	15–3^{[Note A]}	1st	NCAA Division I second round
1996–97	Gene Keady	18–12	12–6	T–2nd	NCAA Division I second round
1997–98	Gene Keady	28–8	12–4	3rd	NCAA Division I Sweet Sixteen
1998–99	Gene Keady	21–13	7–9	7th	NCAA Division I Sweet Sixteen
1999–2000	Gene Keady	24–10	12–4	2nd	NCAA Division I Elite Eight
2000–01	Gene Keady	17–15	6–10	8th	NIT Quarterfinal
2001–02	Gene Keady	13–18	5–11	8th	
2002–03	Gene Keady	19–11	10–6	T–3rd	NCAA Division I second round
2003–04	Gene Keady	17–14	7–9	T–7th	NIT first round
2004–05	Gene Keady	7–21	3–13	10th	
Gene Keady:		493–270	256–169		
Matt Painter (Big Ten Conference) (2005–Present)
2005–06	Matt Painter	9–19	3–13	11th	
2006–07	Matt Painter	22–12	9–7	T–4th	NCAA Division I second round
2007–08	Matt Painter	25–9	15–3	2nd	NCAA Division I second round
2008–09	Matt Painter	27–10	11–7	T–2nd	NCAA Division I Sweet Sixteen
2009–10	Matt Painter	29–6	14–4	T–1st	NCAA Sweet Sixteen
2010–11	Matt Painter	26–8	14–4	2nd	NCAA Division I second round
2011–12	Matt Painter	22–13	10–8	6th	NCAA Division I second round
2012–13	Matt Painter	16–18	8–10	T–7th	CBI Quarterfinal
2013–14	Matt Painter	15–17	5–13	12th	
2014–15	Matt Painter	21–13	12–6	T–3rd	NCAA Division I second round
2015–16	Matt Painter	26–9	12–6	T–3rd	NCAA Division I second round
2016–17	Matt Painter	27–8	14–4	1st	NCAA Division I Sweet Sixteen
2017–18	Matt Painter	30–7	15–3	T–2nd	NCAA Division I Sweet Sixteen
2018–19	Matt Painter	26–10	16–4	T–1st	NCAA Division I Elite Eight
2019–20	Matt Painter	16–15	9–11	T–10th	No postseason held
2020–21	Matt Painter	18–10	13–6	4th	NCAA Division I first round
2021–22	Matt Painter	29–8	14–6	3rd	NCAA Division I Sweet Sixteen
2022–23	Matt Painter	29–6	15–5	1st	NCAA Division I first round
2023–24	Matt Painter	34–5	17–3	1st	NCAA Division I Runner Up
2024–25	Matt Painter	24–12	13–7	T–4th	NCAA Division I Sweet Sixteen
2025–26	Matt Painter	30–9	13–7	T–6th	NCAA Division I Elite Eight
Matt Painter:		501–224	252–137		
Total:		2,001–1,085			
National champion Postseason invitational champion Conference regular season champion Conference regular season and conference tournament champion Division regular season champion Division regular season and conference tournament champion Conference tournament champion

^A.Purdue forfeited 18 regular season wins (6 conference wins) and vacated 1 NCAA Tournament win and 1 NCAA Tournament loss due to use of an ineligible player during the 1995–96 season.
