= List of Nebraska Cornhuskers men's basketball seasons =

This is a list of Nebraska Cornhuskers men's basketball seasons. Nebraska competes as part of NCAA Division I, representing the University of Nebraska–Lincoln in the Big Ten. The team has completed 129 seasons and played 3,053 games.

Nebraska has appeared in eight NCAA Division I tournaments and twenty other national postseason tournaments, winning the 1996 National Invitation Tournament and the 2025 College Basketball Crown. The program has won eight combined conference regular season and tournament championships across the MVIAA, Big Eight, Big 12, and Big Ten, though just one of these came after 1950.

== Seasons ==
Regular season champion	Tournament champion	Division champion	Postseason invitational champion

Season	Coach	Overall (Note: There are discrepancies between the official records of the University of Nebraska–Lincoln and Big Eight Conference regarding the 1910–11, 1912–13, 1920–21, 1924–25, 1929–30, 1932–33, 1945–46, and 1960–61 seasons. All values listed are from Nebraska's media guide.)	Conference	Standing	Postseason (Note: The first national postseason college basketball tournament, the National Invitation Tournament, was created in 1938. The NCAA Division I tournament began in 1939.)
Independent (1897–1907)
1896–97	Frank Lehmer	2–0			
1897–98	Frank Lehmer	1–3			
1898–99	Frank Lehmer	4–0			
1899–00	T. P. Hewitt	5–0			
1900–01	Elmer Berry	3–3			
1901–02	Fred Morrell	5–3			
1902–03	Walter Hiltner	7–5			
1903–04	Raymond G. Clapp	9–5			
1904–05	Raymond G. Clapp	11–5			
1905–06	Raymond G. Clapp	12–2			
1906–07	Raymond G. Clapp	10–6			
MVIAA (1907–1919)
1907–08	Raymond G. Clapp	9–10	4–2	1st (North)	
1908–09	Raymond G. Clapp	8–15	5–5	1st (North)	
1909–10	T. J. Hewiat	6–10	6–2	T–1st (North)	
1910–11	Osmond F. Field	9–9	6–6	2nd (North)	
1911–12	Ewald O. Stiehm	14–1	8–0	1st (North)	
1912–13	Ewald O. Stiehm	17–2	10–0	1st (North)	
1913–14	Ewald O. Stiehm	15–3	7–0	1st (North)	
1914–15	Ewald O. Stiehm	10–8	8–4	2nd	
1915–16	Samuel C. Waugh	13–1	12–0	1st	
1916–17	E. J. Stewart	12–10	4–8	5th	
1917–18	E. J. Stewart	7–7	4–5	T–4th	
1918–19	E. J. Stewart	10–6	3rd		
Independent (1919–1920)
1919–20	Paul J. Schissler	22–2			
MVIAA / Big Eight Conference (Note: In 1928, the ten member schools of the Missouri Valley Intercollegiate Athletic Association agreed to a splintering of the conference – Iowa State, Kansas, Kansas State, Missouri, Nebraska, and Oklahoma retained the MVIAA name and Drake, Grinnell, Oklahoma A&M (now Oklahoma State), and Washington University formed the Missouri Valley Conference. The MVIAA became commonly known as the Big Six, and later the Big Seven and Big Eight. Its name was officially changed to the Big Eight in 1964.) (1920–1996)
1920–21	Paul J. Schissler	15–3	9–1	2nd	
1921–22	Owen A. Frank	8–9	8–8	T–4th	
1922–23	Owen A. Frank	6–12	5–11	T–6th	
1923–24	William G. Kline	11–7	10–6	3rd	
1924–25	William G. Kline	12–5	11–5	2nd	
1925–26	Ernest Bearg	8–10	7–7	5th	
1926–27	Charlie T. Black	12–6	7–5	4th	
1927–28	Charlie T. Black	7–11	7–11	T–7th	
1928–29	Charlie T. Black	11–5	5–5	3rd	
1929–30	Charlie T. Black	9–9	6–4	3rd	
1930–31	Charlie T. Black	9–9	6–4	2nd	
1931–32	Charlie T. Black	3–17	2–8	6th	
1932–33	William Browne	3–13	2–8	5th	
1933–34	William Browne	7–11	5–5	4th	
1934–35	William Browne	6–12	3–7	5th	
1935–36	William Browne	13–8	7–3	2nd	
1936–37	William Browne	13–7	8–2	T–1st	
1937–38	William Browne	9–11	4–6	T–3rd	
1938–39	William Browne	7–13	3–7	5th	
1939–40	William Browne	6–12	2–8	T–2nd	
1940–41	Adolph J. Lewandowski	8–10	6–4	3rd	
1941–42	Adolph J. Lewandowski	6–13	4–6	4th	
1942–43	Adolph J. Lewandowski	6–10	5–5	T–3rd	
1943–44	Adolph J. Lewandowski	2–13	1–9	6th	
1944–45	Adolph J. Lewandowski	2–17	1–9	6th	
1945–46	Pop Klein	7–13	3–7	T–4th	
1946–47	Harry Good	10–14	3–7	T–5th	
1947–48	Harry Good	11–13	5–7	5th	
1948–49	Harry Good	16–10	9–3	T–1st	NCAA district playoff
1949–50	Harry Good	16–7	8–4	T–1st	
1950–51	Harry Good	9–14	4–8	5th	
1951–52	Harry Good	7–17	3–9	7th	
1952–53	Harry Good	9–11	4–8	T–4th	
1953–54	Harry Good	8–13	5–7	T–3rd	
1954–55	Jerry Bush	9–12	6–6	4th	
1955–56	Jerry Bush	7–16	3–9	6th	
1956–57	Jerry Bush	11–12	5–7	T–4th	
1957–58	Jerry Bush	10–13	5–7	T–4th	
1958–59	Jerry Bush	12–13	5–9	T–5th	
1959–60	Jerry Bush	7–17	4–10	T–7th	
1960–61	Jerry Bush	10–14	4–10	6th	
1961–62	Jerry Bush	9–16	5–9	T–5th	
1962–63	Jerry Bush	6–19	1–13	8th	
1963–64	Joe Cipriano	7–18	5–9	T–6th	
1964–65	Joe Cipriano	10–15	5–9	T–6th	
1965–66	Joe Cipriano	20–5	12–2	2nd	
1966–67	Joe Cipriano	16–9	10–4	T–2nd	NIT first round
1967–68	Joe Cipriano	15–10	8–6	T–3rd	
1968–69	Joe Cipriano	12–14	5–9	T–6th	
1969–70	Joe Cipriano	16–9	7–7	T–3rd	
1970–71	Joe Cipriano	18–8	8–6	4th	
1971–72	Joe Cipriano	14–12	7–7	4th	
1972–73	Joe Cipriano	9–17	4–10	T–6th	
1973–74	Joe Cipriano	14–12	7–7	4th	
1974–75	Joe Cipriano	14–12	7–7	4th	
1975–76	Joe Cipriano	19–8	10–4	3rd	
1976–77	Joe Cipriano	15–14	7–7	5th	
1977–78	Joe Cipriano	22–8	9–5	2nd	NIT second round
1978–79	Joe Cipriano	14–13	7–7	5th	
1979–80	Joe Cipriano	18–13	8–6	T–2nd	NIT first round
1980–81	Moe Iba	15–12	9–5	T–2nd	
1981–82	Moe Iba	16–12	7–7	T–4th	
1982–83	Moe Iba	22–10	9–5	T–3rd	NIT semifinal
1983–84	Moe Iba	18–12	7–7	3rd	NIT second round
1984–85	Moe Iba	16–14	5–9	T–5th	NIT second round
1985–86	Moe Iba	19–11	8–6	T–3rd	NCAA Division I first round
1986–87	Danny Nee	21–12	7–7	5th	NIT third place
1987–88	Danny Nee	13–18	4–10	T–6th	
1988–89	Danny Nee	17–16	4–10	7th	
1989–90	Danny Nee	10–18	3–11	7th	
1990–91	Danny Nee	26–8	9–5	3rd	NCAA Division I first round
1991–92	Danny Nee	19–10	7–7	5th	NCAA Division I first round
1992–93	Danny Nee	20–11	8–6	T–2nd	NCAA Division I first round
1993–94	Danny Nee	20–10	7–7	4th	NCAA Division I first round
1994–95	Danny Nee	18–14	4–10	7th	NIT second round
1995–96	Danny Nee	21–14	4–10	7th	NIT champion
Big 12 Conference (1996–2011)
1996–97	Danny Nee	18–15	7–9	T–7th	NIT quarterfinal
1997–98	Danny Nee	20–12	10–6	4th	NCAA Division I first round
1998–99	Danny Nee	20–13	10–6	T–5th	NIT second round
1999-00	Danny Nee	11–19	4–12	T–8th	
2000–01	Barry Collier	14–16	7–9	7th	
2001–02	Barry Collier	13–15	6–10	T–7th	
2002–03	Barry Collier	11–19	3–13	12th	
2003–04	Barry Collier	18–13	6–10	9th	NIT second round
2004–05	Barry Collier	14–14	7–9	T–8th	
2005–06	Barry Collier	19–14	7–9	6th	NIT first round
2006–07	Doc Sadler	17–14	6–10	7th	
2007–08	Doc Sadler	20–13	7–9	T–7th	NIT second round
2008–09	Doc Sadler	18–13	8–8	8th	NIT first round
2009–10	Doc Sadler	15–18	2–14	12th	
2010–11	Doc Sadler	19–13	7–9	T–7th	NIT first round
Big Ten Conference (2011–present)
2011–12	Doc Sadler	12–18	4–14	T–11th	
2012–13	Tim Miles	15–18	5–13	10th	
2013–14	Tim Miles	19–13	11–7	4th	NCAA Division I first round
2014–15	Tim Miles	13–18	5–13	12th	
2015–16	Tim Miles	16–18	6–12	11th	
2016–17	Tim Miles	12–19	6–12	T–12th	
2017–18	Tim Miles	22–11	13–5	T–4th	NIT first round
2018–19	Tim Miles	19–17	6–14	13th	NIT second round
2019–20	Fred Hoiberg	7–25	2–18	14th	Canceled (Note: Canceled due to the COVID-19 pandemic.)
2020–21	Fred Hoiberg	7–20	3–16	14th	
2021–22	Fred Hoiberg	10–22	4–16	T–13th	
2022–23	Fred Hoiberg	16–16	9–11	T–11th	
2023–24	Fred Hoiberg	23–11	12–8	T–3rd	NCAA Division I first round
2024–25	Fred Hoiberg	21–14	7–13	T–12th	College Basketball Crown champion
2025–26	Fred Hoiberg	28–7	15–5	T–2nd	NCAA Division I Sweet Sixteen
2026–27	Fred Hoiberg	5–0	0–0	T–1st	
