= 1900–01 Colgate men's basketball team =

American college basketball season

1900–01 Colgate Raiders men's basketball
- Conference: Independent
- Record: 5–8
- Head coach: Ellery Huntington, Sr. (1st season)
- Captain: Earl Sweet
- Home arena: none

1900–01 collegiate men's basketball independents standings
| | Conf. | | | | Overall |
| Team | W | | L | PCT | W | | L | PCT |
|---|---|---|---|---|---|---|---|---|
| Amherst | | – | | – | 4 | – | 0 | 1.000 |
| Connecticut | | – | | – | 1 | – | 0 | 1.000 |
| Michigan State | | – | | – | 3 | – | 0 | 1.000 |
| Washington | | – | | – | 1 | – | 0 | 1.000 |
| Bucknell | | – | | – | 12 | – | 1 | .923 |
| Allegheny | | – | | – | 14 | – | 2 | .875 |
| Geneva | | – | | – | 10 | – | 2 | .833 |
| Penn State | | – | | – | 5 | – | 1 | .833 |
| Hiram | | – | | – | 9 | – | 2 | .818 |
| Williams | | – | | – | 9 | – | 2 | .818 |
| Illinois State | | – | | – | 4 | – | 1 | .800 |
| North Dakota Agricultural | | – | | – | 4 | – | 1 | .800 |
| Wisconsin–Superior | | – | | – | 8 | – | 2 | .800 |
| Butler | | – | | – | 2 | – | 1 | .667 |
| Western Reserve | | – | | – | 5 | – | 3 | .625 |
| Mount Union | | – | | – | 10 | – | 6 | .625 |
| Yale | | – | | – | 10 | – | 2 | .833 |
| Princeton | | – | | – | 7 | – | 5 | .583 |
| Dartmouth | | – | | – | 11 | – | 8 | .579 |
| Harvard | | – | | – | 11 | – | 8 | .579 |
| Grinnell | | – | | – | 4 | – | 3 | .571 |
| Lafayette | | – | | – | 4 | – | 3 | .571 |
| Holy Cross | | – | | – | 6 | – | 6 | .500 |
| Muhlenberg | | – | | – | 4 | – | 3 | .571 |
| Nebraska | | – | | – | 3 | – | 3 | .500 |
| Rensselaer | | – | | – | 4 | – | 4 | .500 |
| Syracuse | | – | | – | 2 | – | 2 | .500 |
| Vanderbilt | | – | | – | 2 | – | 2 | .500 |
| Wisconsin–Stevens Point | | – | | – | 4 | – | 4 | .500 |
| Brown | | – | | – | 3 | – | 4 | .429 |
| Colgate | | – | | – | 5 | – | 8 | .385 |
| Cornell | | – | | – | 2 | – | 4 | .333 |
| Kansas | | – | | – | 4 | – | 8 | .333 |
| Westminster (Pa.) | | – | | – | 2 | – | 5 | .286 |
| Ohio State | | – | | – | 1 | – | 3 | .250 |
| Columbia | | – | | – | 1 | – | 4 | .200 |
| Grove City | | – | | – | 2 | – | 8 | .200 |
| Gettysburg | | – | | – | 1 | – | 5 | .167 |
| Wabash | | – | | – | 2 | – | 10 | .167 |
| Indiana State | | – | | – | 0 | – | 4 | .000 |
| Wooster | | – | | – | 0 | – | 2 | .000 |

The 1900–01 Colgate Raiders men's basketball team represented Colgate University during the 1900–01 college men's basketball season. The head coach was Ellery Huntington Sr. coaching the Raiders in his first season. The team finished with an overall record of 5–8.

== Schedule ==
| Date time, TV | Opponent | Result | Record | Site city, state |
|---|---|---|---|---|
| * | at Little Falls A.A. | L 13–38 | 0–1 | |
| * | Academy | W 31–10 | 1–1 | Hamilton, NY |
| * | at Watervliet YMCA | L 03–08 | 1–2 | |
| * | at Vermont | L 06–08 | 1–3 | |
| * | at Washington Continentals | L 01–16 | 1–4 | |
| * | Hamilton | W 20–19 | 2–4 | Hamilton, NY |
| * | Potsdam | W 18–17 | 3–4 | Hamilton, NY |
| * | at Hamilton | L 14–42 | 3–5 | |
| * | at Watervliet YMCA | L 16–18 | 3–6 | |
| * | at Williams | L 09–17 | 3–7 | Williamstown, MA |
| * | at Utica Separate Co | W 25–5 | 4–7 | |
| * | at Elmira Separate Co | W 15–10 | 5–7 | |
| * | Dartmouth | L 19–23 | 5–8 | Hamilton, NY |
*Non-conference game. (#) Tournament seedings in parentheses.
