= 1900–01 Indiana State Sycamores men's basketball team =

American college basketball season

1900–01 Indiana State Sycamores men's basketball
- Conference: Independent
- Record: 0–4
- Head coach: John Kimmell (2nd season)
- Home arena: North Hall

1900–01 collegiate men's basketball independents standings
	Conf.				Overall
Team	W		L	PCT	W		L	PCT
Amherst		–		–	4	–	0	1.000
Connecticut		–		–	1	–	0	1.000
Michigan State		–		–	3	–	0	1.000
Washington		–		–	1	–	0	1.000
Bucknell		–		–	12	–	1	.923
Allegheny		–		–	14	–	2	.875
Geneva		–		–	10	–	2	.833
Penn State		–		–	5	–	1	.833
Hiram		–		–	9	–	2	.818
Williams		–		–	9	–	2	.818
Illinois State		–		–	4	–	1	.800
North Dakota Agricultural		–		–	4	–	1	.800
Wisconsin–Superior		–		–	8	–	2	.800
Butler		–		–	2	–	1	.667
Western Reserve		–		–	5	–	3	.625
Mount Union		–		–	10	–	6	.625
Yale		–		–	10	–	2	.833
Princeton		–		–	7	–	5	.583
Dartmouth		–		–	11	–	8	.579
Harvard		–		–	11	–	8	.579
Grinnell		–		–	4	–	3	.571
Lafayette		–		–	4	–	3	.571
Holy Cross		–		–	6	–	6	.500
Muhlenberg		–		–	4	–	3	.571
Nebraska		–		–	3	–	3	.500
Rensselaer		–		–	4	–	4	.500
Syracuse		–		–	2	–	2	.500
Vanderbilt		–		–	2	–	2	.500
Wisconsin–Stevens Point		–		–	4	–	4	.500
Brown		–		–	3	–	4	.429
Colgate		–		–	5	–	8	.385
Cornell		–		–	2	–	4	.333
Kansas		–		–	4	–	8	.333
Westminster (Pa.)		–		–	2	–	5	.286
Ohio State		–		–	1	–	3	.250
Columbia		–		–	1	–	4	.200
Grove City		–		–	2	–	8	.200
Gettysburg		–		–	1	–	5	.167
Wabash		–		–	2	–	10	.167
Indiana State		–		–	0	–	4	.000
Wooster		–		–	0	–	2	.000

The 1900–01 Indiana State Sycamores men's basketball team represented Indiana State University during the 1900–01 collegiate men's basketball season. The head coach was John Kimmell, in his second season coaching the Sycamores. The team played their home games at North Hall in Terre Haute, Indiana.

== Schedule ==
Date time, TV	Opponent	Result	Record	Site city, state
1/09/1901	Terre Haute H.S.	L 11–13	0–1	North Hall; Terre Haute, IN
2/??/1901	Rose Polytechnic	L 13–16	0–2	North Hall; Terre Haute, IN
2/22/1901	Rose Polytechnic	L 16–22	0–3	North Hall; Terre Haute, IN
3/08/1901	YMCA Terre Haute	L 14–29	0–4	North Hall; Terre Haute, IN
*Non-conference game. (#) Tournament seedings in parentheses.
