= 1900–01 Cornell Big Red men's basketball team =

American college basketball season

1900–01 Cornell Big Red men's basketball
- Conference: Independent
- Record: 2–4–1
- Head coach: none
- Home arena: none

1900–01 collegiate men's basketball independents standings
| | Conf. | | | | Overall |
| Team | W | | L | PCT | W | | L | PCT |
|---|---|---|---|---|---|---|---|---|
| Amherst | | – | | – | 4 | – | 0 | 1.000 |
| Connecticut | | – | | – | 1 | – | 0 | 1.000 |
| Michigan State | | – | | – | 3 | – | 0 | 1.000 |
| Washington | | – | | – | 1 | – | 0 | 1.000 |
| Bucknell | | – | | – | 12 | – | 1 | .923 |
| Allegheny | | – | | – | 14 | – | 2 | .875 |
| Geneva | | – | | – | 10 | – | 2 | .833 |
| Penn State | | – | | – | 5 | – | 1 | .833 |
| Hiram | | – | | – | 9 | – | 2 | .818 |
| Williams | | – | | – | 9 | – | 2 | .818 |
| Illinois State | | – | | – | 4 | – | 1 | .800 |
| North Dakota Agricultural | | – | | – | 4 | – | 1 | .800 |
| Wisconsin–Superior | | – | | – | 8 | – | 2 | .800 |
| Butler | | – | | – | 2 | – | 1 | .667 |
| Western Reserve | | – | | – | 5 | – | 3 | .625 |
| Mount Union | | – | | – | 10 | – | 6 | .625 |
| Yale | | – | | – | 10 | – | 2 | .833 |
| Princeton | | – | | – | 7 | – | 5 | .583 |
| Dartmouth | | – | | – | 11 | – | 8 | .579 |
| Harvard | | – | | – | 11 | – | 8 | .579 |
| Grinnell | | – | | – | 4 | – | 3 | .571 |
| Lafayette | | – | | – | 4 | – | 3 | .571 |
| Holy Cross | | – | | – | 6 | – | 6 | .500 |
| Muhlenberg | | – | | – | 4 | – | 3 | .571 |
| Nebraska | | – | | – | 3 | – | 3 | .500 |
| Rensselaer | | – | | – | 4 | – | 4 | .500 |
| Syracuse | | – | | – | 2 | – | 2 | .500 |
| Vanderbilt | | – | | – | 2 | – | 2 | .500 |
| Wisconsin–Stevens Point | | – | | – | 4 | – | 4 | .500 |
| Brown | | – | | – | 3 | – | 4 | .429 |
| Colgate | | – | | – | 5 | – | 8 | .385 |
| Cornell | | – | | – | 2 | – | 4 | .333 |
| Kansas | | – | | – | 4 | – | 8 | .333 |
| Westminster (Pa.) | | – | | – | 2 | – | 5 | .286 |
| Ohio State | | – | | – | 1 | – | 3 | .250 |
| Columbia | | – | | – | 1 | – | 4 | .200 |
| Grove City | | – | | – | 2 | – | 8 | .200 |
| Gettysburg | | – | | – | 1 | – | 5 | .167 |
| Wabash | | – | | – | 2 | – | 10 | .167 |
| Indiana State | | – | | – | 0 | – | 4 | .000 |
| Wooster | | – | | – | 0 | – | 2 | .000 |

The 1900–01 Cornell Big Red men's basketball team represented Cornell University during the 1900–01 college men's basketball season. The team finished with a final record of 2–4–1.

== Schedule ==
| Date time, TV | Opponent | Result | Record | Site city, state |
|---|---|---|---|---|
| 1/12/1901* | Geneva 34th Sep. Company | W 37–12 | 1–0 | Ithaca, NY |
| 1/16/1901* | at Vermont | W 16–6 | 2–0 | Burlington, VT |
| 1/18/1901* | at Dartmouth | L 12–26 | 2–1 | Hanover, NH |
| 1/19/1901* | vs. Yale | L 2–22 | 2–2 | Schenectady, NY |
| 2/16/1901* | at Syracuse | L 15–18 | 2–3 | Syracuse, NY |
| 3/1/1901* | at Rensselaer | L 7–20 | 2–4 | |
| 3/2/1901* | at Hamilton | T 12–12 | 2–4–1 | Hamilton, NY |
*Non-conference game. (#) Tournament seedings in parentheses.
