= 1900–01 Syracuse Orangemen basketball team =

American college basketball season

1900–01 Syracuse Orangemen men's basketball
- Conference: Independent
- Record: 2–2
- Head coach: None
- Captains: Fred Stensel; Bill Lowe
- Home arena: Syracuse University Gymnasium

1900–01 collegiate men's basketball independents standings
	Conf.				Overall
Team	W		L	PCT	W		L	PCT
Amherst		–		–	4	–	0	1.000
Connecticut		–		–	1	–	0	1.000
Michigan State		–		–	3	–	0	1.000
Washington		–		–	1	–	0	1.000
Bucknell		–		–	12	–	1	.923
Allegheny		–		–	14	–	2	.875
Geneva		–		–	10	–	2	.833
Penn State		–		–	5	–	1	.833
Hiram		–		–	9	–	2	.818
Williams		–		–	9	–	2	.818
Illinois State		–		–	4	–	1	.800
North Dakota Agricultural		–		–	4	–	1	.800
Wisconsin–Superior		–		–	8	–	2	.800
Butler		–		–	2	–	1	.667
Western Reserve		–		–	5	–	3	.625
Mount Union		–		–	10	–	6	.625
Yale		–		–	10	–	2	.833
Princeton		–		–	7	–	5	.583
Dartmouth		–		–	11	–	8	.579
Harvard		–		–	11	–	8	.579
Grinnell		–		–	4	–	3	.571
Lafayette		–		–	4	–	3	.571
Holy Cross		–		–	6	–	6	.500
Muhlenberg		–		–	4	–	3	.571
Nebraska		–		–	3	–	3	.500
Rensselaer		–		–	4	–	4	.500
Syracuse		–		–	2	–	2	.500
Vanderbilt		–		–	2	–	2	.500
Wisconsin–Stevens Point		–		–	4	–	4	.500
Brown		–		–	3	–	4	.429
Colgate		–		–	5	–	8	.385
Cornell		–		–	2	–	4	.333
Kansas		–		–	4	–	8	.333
Westminster (Pa.)		–		–	2	–	5	.286
Ohio State		–		–	1	–	3	.250
Columbia		–		–	1	–	4	.200
Grove City		–		–	2	–	8	.200
Gettysburg		–		–	1	–	5	.167
Wabash		–		–	2	–	10	.167
Indiana State		–		–	0	–	4	.000
Wooster		–		–	0	–	2	.000

The 1900–01 Syracuse Orangemen basketball team represented Syracuse University during the 1900–01 college men's basketball season. It was their first season of varsity basketball. There was no coach; instead captain Bill Lowe headed the team's operations.

== Schedule ==
Date time, TV	Opponent	Result	Record	Site city, state
1/5/1901*	RPI	L 8–23	0–1	
2/16/1901*	Cornell	W 18–15	1–1	
2/26/1901*	St. Lawrence	W 21–17	2–1	
3/2/1901*	St. John's Military Academy	L 15–21	2–2	
*Non-conference game. (#) Tournament seedings in parentheses.

== Roster ==
- Clinton Goodwin
- Courtney Whittemore
- Earl Twombley
- George Lamb
- Bill Lowe
- Avery Gannett
- Harley Crane
