= William Geiger =

American football coach

Coaching career (HC unless noted)
- 1908–1909: RPI

Head coaching record
- Overall: 9–5–1

William Geiger was the head football coach for the Rensselaer Polytechnic Institute Engineers football team in 1908 and 1909. He compiled a record of 9–5–1.

== Head coaching record ==
| Year | Team | Overall | Conference | Standing | Bowl/playoffs |
|---|---|---|---|---|---|
RPI Engineers (Independent) (1908–1909)
| 1908 | RPI | 6–1–1 | | | |
| 1909 | RPI | 3–4 | | | |
| RPI: | | 9–5–1 | | | |
| Total: | | 9–5–1 | | | |
