= Dutchman's Shoes =

- RPI Engineers Union Garnet Chargers
- Sport: Football
- First meeting: November 20, 1886; RPI 11, Union 4
- Latest meeting: November 14, 2026; RPI 25, Union 8
- Next meeting: November 13, 2027 (expected)
- Trophy: Dutchman's Shoes (since 1950)

Statistics
- Total meetings: 123
- All-time series: Union leads, 84–35–4 (.699)
- Trophy series: Union leads, 51–25 (.671)
- Largest victory: Union, 45–0 (1916)
- Longest win streak: Union, 11 (1960–1970)
- Current win streak: RPI, 1 (2026–present)

The Dutchman's Shoes is a trophy awarded to the winner of the annual college football game between the Rensselaer Polytechnic Institute Engineers and the Union College Garnet Chargers since 1950. These two schools have played each other more than 120 times, making it the oldest football rivalry in the state of New York.

The trophy consists of a wooden base, with two clogs mounted on a small pedestal, with one painted cherry red with a white letter "R", and the other garnet with a white letter "U", for Rensselaer and Union, respectively.

Locations in New York
Locations of RPI and Union

== History ==
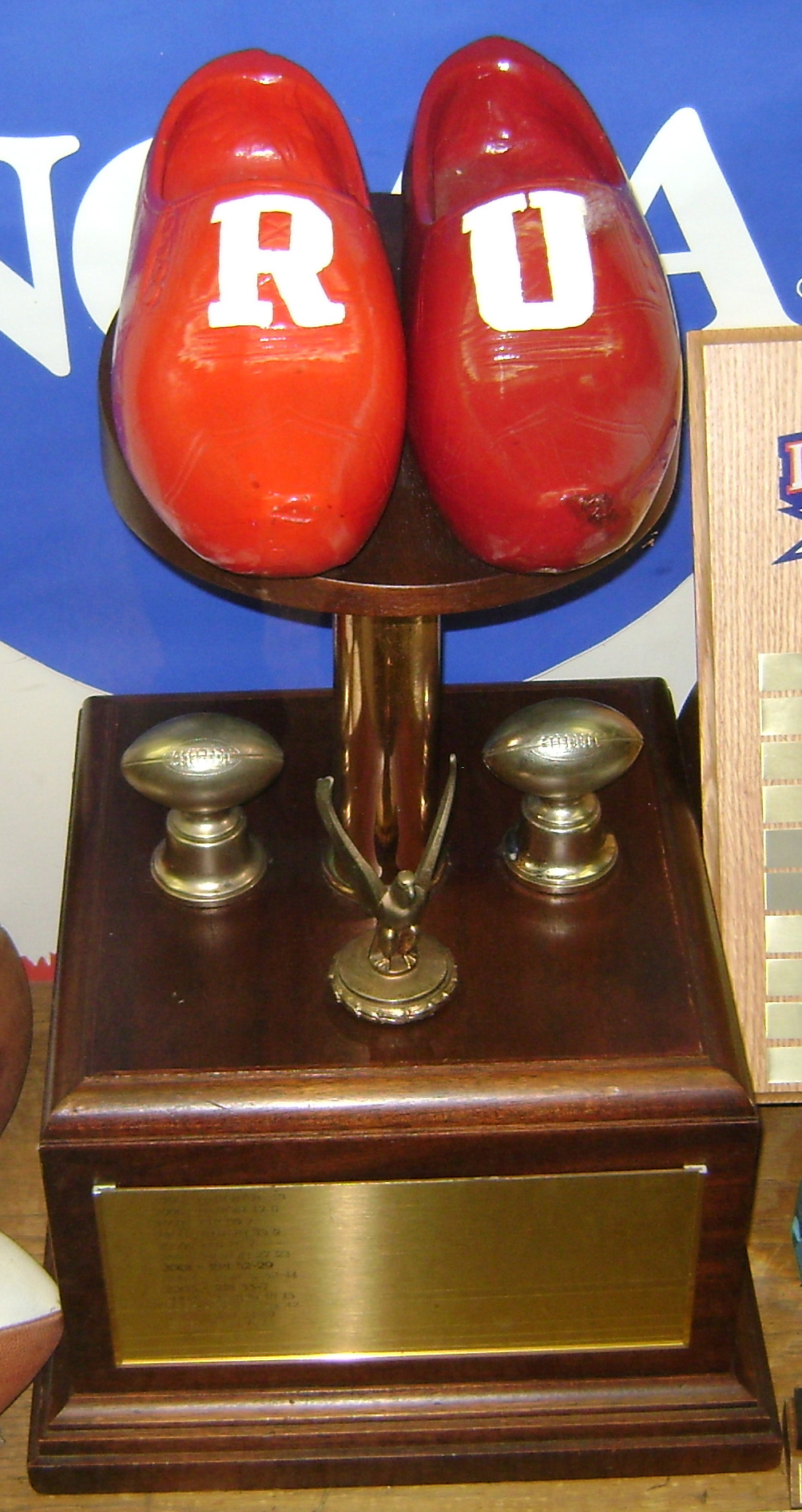
Dutchman's Shoes trophy

The rivalry began in 1886, but the trophy wasn't introduced until 1950. The Dutchman's Shoes is a nod to the heritage of both schools, with a R for the Engineers and a U for the Garnet Chargers. Prior to the introduction of the trophy, Union dominated, winning 33 of the 47 pre-trophy meetings, with three streaks of at least eight consecutive wins over RPI in that timespan. In terms of the trophy series, Union leads 51–25, but in the 21st century, RPI has won 15 out of 26 matchups, including a 5-game win streak from 2013 to 2017. Due to it often being the season finale for both schools, the Dutchman's Shoes has been a de facto championship game for the Liberty League title and the automatic berth to the Division III playoffs. This includes the 2005 game, a 49–42 victory for Union, the highest scoring game in the history of the rivalry, as well as the 2021 edition of the rivalry ending on a field goal by RPI as time expired to give them a 19–17 victory and the league title.

== Game results ==
RPI victories	Union victories	Tie games

No.	Date	Location	Winning team		Losing team	
1	November 20, 1886 (Note: The first game between RPI and Union, which was played on November 20, 1886, was recorded as a 11–4 victory for RPI, but Union disputed the score over the grounds of inept and corrupt officiating and recorded the game as a 4–0 win.)	West Troy, NY	RPI	11	Union	4
2	November 23, 1889	Schenectady, NY	Union	10	RPI	0
3	October 1, 1892	West Troy, NY	Union	4	RPI	0
4	October 22, 1892	Schenectady, NY	Union	20	RPI	4
5	October 7, 1893	West Troy, NY	Union	10	RPI	6
6	September 29, 1894	West Troy, NY	Union	37	RPI	0
7	October 26, 1895	Schenectady, NY	Union	26	RPI	0
8	October 22, 1898	Schenectady, NY	Union	22	RPI	0
9	September 30, 1899	Schenectady, NY	RPI	6	Union	5
10	October 21, 1899	Albany, NY (Note: Game was played at Ridgefield Park.)	Union	6	RPI	0
11	October 27, 1900	Schenectady, NY	Union	5	RPI	0
12	October 5, 1901	Troy, NY	Union	17	RPI	0
13	October 26, 1901	Schenectady, NY	Union	18	RPI	0
14	October 31, 1903	Schenectady, NY	Union	12	RPI	11
15	October 22, 1904	Schenectady, NY	Union	21	RPI	0
16	October 31, 1914	Troy, NY	Union	24	RPI	0
17	November 6, 1915	Schenectady, NY	Union	7	RPI	0
18	November 4, 1916	Troy, NY	Union	45	RPI	0
19	November 10, 1917	Schenectady, NY	Union	19	RPI	3
20	November 23, 1918	Troy, NY	RPI	14	Union	6
21	November 22, 1919	Schenectady, NY	Tie	0	Tie	0
22	October 25, 1924	Troy, NY	Tie	7	Tie	7
23	October 24, 1925	Schenectady, NY	Union	40	RPI	0
24	October 23, 1926	Troy, NY	Union	21	RPI	6
25	October 22, 1927	Schenectady, NY	Union	21	RPI	3
26	October 26, 1929	Schenectady, NY	Union	7	RPI	2
27	October 27, 1929	Troy, NY	RPI	14	Union	6
28	October 25, 1930	Troy, NY	Tie	0	Tie	0
29	October 24, 1931	Schenectady, NY	Union	21	RPI	0
30	November 21, 1931	Menands, NY	Union	7	RPI	2
31	October 22, 1932	Troy, NY	Union	13	RPI	0
32	October 28, 1933	Schenectady, NY	RPI	16	Union	0
33	October 27, 1934	Troy, NY	Union	18	RPI	6
34	October 26, 1935	Schenectady, NY	Union	21	RPI	0
35	October 24, 1936	Troy, NY	Union	6	RPI	0
36	October 23, 1937	Schenectady, NY	Tie	6	Tie	6
37	October 22, 1938	Troy, NY	Union	26	RPI	13
38	October 28, 1939	Schenectady, NY	Union	26	RPI	6
39	October 26, 1940	Troy, NY	RPI	12	Union	0
40	October 25, 1941	Schenectady, NY	RPI	32	Union	0
41	October 24, 1942	Troy, NY	Union	38	RPI	6
42	September 9, 1944	Troy, NY	RPI	20	Union	6
43	October 7, 1944	Schenectady, NY	RPI	27	Union	14
44	October 19, 1946	Schenectady, NY	Union	27	RPI	7
45	October 18, 1947	Troy, NY	RPI	33	Union	24
46	October 16, 1948	Schenectady, NY	Union	35	RPI	14
47	October 15, 1949	Troy, NY	Union	14	RPI	6
48	October 7, 1950	Schenectady, NY	Union	20	RPI	0
49	October 6, 1951	Troy, NY	Union	21	RPI	14
50	October 18, 1952	Schenectady, NY	Union	42	RPI	6
51	October 17, 1953	Troy, NY	Union	32	RPI	6
52	October 16, 1954	Schenectady, NY	Union	27	RPI	6
53	October 15, 1955	Troy, NY	Union	32	RPI	12
54	October 20, 1956	Schenectady, NY	Union	27	RPI	0
55	November 12, 1957	Troy, NY	RPI	20	Union	19
56	October 18, 1958	Schenectady, NY	RPI	21	Union	0
57	October 17, 1959	Troy, NY	RPI	21	Union	0
58	October 15, 1960	Schenectady, NY	Union	14	RPI	7
59	October 21, 1961	Troy, NY	Union	10	RPI	8
60	October 20, 1962	Schenectady, NY	Union	44	RPI	6
61	October 19, 1963	Troy, NY	Union	29	RPI	6
62	October 17, 1964	Schenectady, NY	Union	27	RPI	3
63	October 16, 1965	Troy, NY	Union	48	RPI	14
64	October 15, 1966	Schenectady, NY	Union	31	RPI	14
65	October 21, 1967	Troy, NY	Union	37	RPI	35
66	October 19, 1968	Schenectady, NY	Union	24	RPI	14
67	October 18, 1969	Troy, NY	Union	23	RPI	16
68	October 17, 1970	Schenectady, NY	Union	14	RPI	0
69	October 16, 1971	Troy, NY	RPI	35	Union	18
70	October 21, 1972	Schenectady, NY	Union	38	RPI	21
71	October 20, 1973	Troy, NY	Union	18	RPI	14
72	October 19, 1974	Schenectady, NY	RPI	17	Union	14
73	October 18, 1975	Troy, NY	Union	21	RPI	0
74	October 16, 1976	Schenectady, NY	Union	19	RPI	8
75	October 15, 1977	Schenectady, NY	Union	22	RPI	13
76	October 14, 1978	Schenectady, NY	Union	27	RPI	0
77	October 13, 1979	Troy, NY	Union	13	RPI	3
78	October 11, 1980	Schenectady, NY	RPI	14	Union	13
79	October 17, 1981	Troy, NY	Union	21	RPI	7
80	October 16, 1982	Schenectady, NY	Union	37	RPI	7
81	October 15, 1983	Troy, NY	Union	35	RPI	0
82	October 13, 1984	Schenectady, NY	Union	38	RPI	0
83	October 12, 1985	Troy, NY	Union	35	RPI	6
84	October 11, 1986	Schenectady, NY	Union	35	RPI	14
85	October 17, 1987	Troy, NY	RPI	29	Union	17
86	October 15, 1988	Schenectady, NY	Union	27	RPI	0
87	October 14, 1989	Troy, NY	Union	28	RPI	3
88	October 13, 1990	Schenectady, NY	Union	24	RPI	17
89	October 12, 1991	Troy, NY	Union	35	RPI	10
90	October 17, 1992	Schenectady, NY	RPI	23	Union	8
91	October 16, 1993	Troy, NY	Union	19	RPI	16
92	October 15, 1994	Schenectady, NY	Union	23	RPI	6
93	October 14, 1995	Troy, NY	Union	16	RPI	13
94	October 19, 1996	Schenectady, NY	Union	17	RPI	0
95	October 18, 1997	Troy, NY	RPI	30	Union	7
96	October 17, 1998	Schenectady, NY	Union	33	RPI	8
97	October 16, 1999	Troy, NY	RPI	16	Union	7
98	October 16, 2000	Schenectady, NY	Union	27	RPI	23
99	October 14, 2001	Troy, NY	RPI	32	Union	29
100	October 12, 2002	Schenectady, NY	Union	32	RPI	14
101	October 11, 2003	Troy, NY	RPI	33	Union	7
102	November 13, 2004	Troy, NY	Union	33	RPI	27
103	November 12, 2005	Schenectady, NY	Union	49	RPI	42
104	November 11, 2006	Troy, NY	RPI	24	Union	19
105	November 10, 2007	Schenectady, NY	RPI	20	Union	14
106	November 1, 2008	Troy, NY	RPI	25	Union	12
107	October 31, 2009	Schenectady, NY	Union	20	RPI	15
108	October 30, 2010	Troy, NY	RPI	21	Union	7
109	October 29, 2011	Schenectady, NY	Union	38	RPI	28
110	November 10, 2012	Troy, NY	Union	34	RPI	28^{OT}
111	November 16, 2013	Schenectady, NY	RPI	31	Union	28
112	November 15, 2014	Troy, NY	RPI	31	Union	28
113	November 14, 2015	Schenectady, NY	RPI	23	Union	10
114	November 12, 2016	Troy, NY	RPI	21	Union	12
115	November 11, 2017	Schenectady, NY	RPI	20	Union	14
116	November 10, 2018	Troy, NY	Union	34	RPI	10
117	November 16, 2019	Schenectady, NY	Union	33	RPI	0
118	November 13, 2021	Schenectady, NY	RPI	19	Union	17
119	November 12, 2022	Troy, NY	RPI	23	Union	13
120	November 11, 2023	Schenectady, NY	Union	13	RPI	7
121	November 16, 2024	Troy, NY	RPI	24	Union	7
122	November 15, 2025	Schenectady, NY	Union	28	RPI	21
123	November 14, 2026	Troy, NY	RPI	25	Union	8
Series: Union leads 84–35–4

== See also ==
- List of NCAA college football rivalry games
