= Nashville Athletic Club =

Sports club for young men in 1884 Nashville, Tennessee

The Nashville Athletic Club (NAC) was a sports club for young men founded in Nashville, Tennessee in 1884. The NAC was responsible for helping popularize the sports of baseball, football, basketball, athletics, gymnastics and swimming in the Nashville area. The NAC also featured a swimming pool, a gymnasium, Turkish and Russian baths and choice exercise equipment. It was based for some time at 520 Commerce Street in downtown Nashville.

== Baseball ==
The NAC originally had the only regulation size baseball diamond in Nashville located at Sulpher Springs Bottom (later called Athletic Park, then Sulphur Dell).

== Football ==
The NAC is believed to have played the first organized football game in Nashville on Thanksgiving Day, 1885 against the Nashville Football Club, winning 6-4 in a game played at Athletic Park. They lost their only recorded game against Vanderbilt in 1895, 20-4.

== Basketball ==
The NAC also played some of the first organized basketball games in Nashville, forming the Nashville Athletic Club Basket Ball League in 1895. They played 13 recorded games against Vanderbilt between 1900 and 1909, winning 4 and losing 9.
