= 1900–01 Wisconsin Badgers men's basketball team =

American college basketball season

1900–01 Wisconsin Badgers men's basketball
- Conference: Big Ten Conference
- Record: 1–1 (0–1 Western)
- Head coach: James C. Elsom
- Home arena: Red Gym

1900–01 Western Conference men's basketball standings
	Conf.				Overall
Team	W		L	PCT	W		L	PCT
Purdue†	2	–	0	1.000	12	–	0	1.000
Minnesota	1	–	0	1.000	11	–	1	.917
Wisconsin	0	–	1	.000	1	–	1	.500
Indiana	0	–	2	.000	1	–	4	.200
† Intramural play only; the conference did not have an official championship winner

The 1900–01 Wisconsin Badgers men's basketball team represented University of Wisconsin–Madison. The head coach was Dr. James C. Elsom, coaching his third season with the Badgers. The team played their home games at the Red Gym in Madison, Wisconsin and was a member of the Western Conference.

== Schedule ==
Date time, TV	Rank^{#}	Opponent^{#}	Result	Record	Site city, state
Regular Season
1/18/1901*		at Wayland Academy (WI)	W 35–22	1–0	Beaver Dam, WI
2/23/1901		at Minnesota	L 15–42	1–1	Minnesota Armory; Minneapolis, MN
*Non-conference game. ^{#}Rankings from AP Poll. (#) Tournament seedings in parentheses.
