= 1900–01 Indiana Hoosiers men's basketball team =

American college basketball season

1900–01 Indiana Hoosiers men's basketball
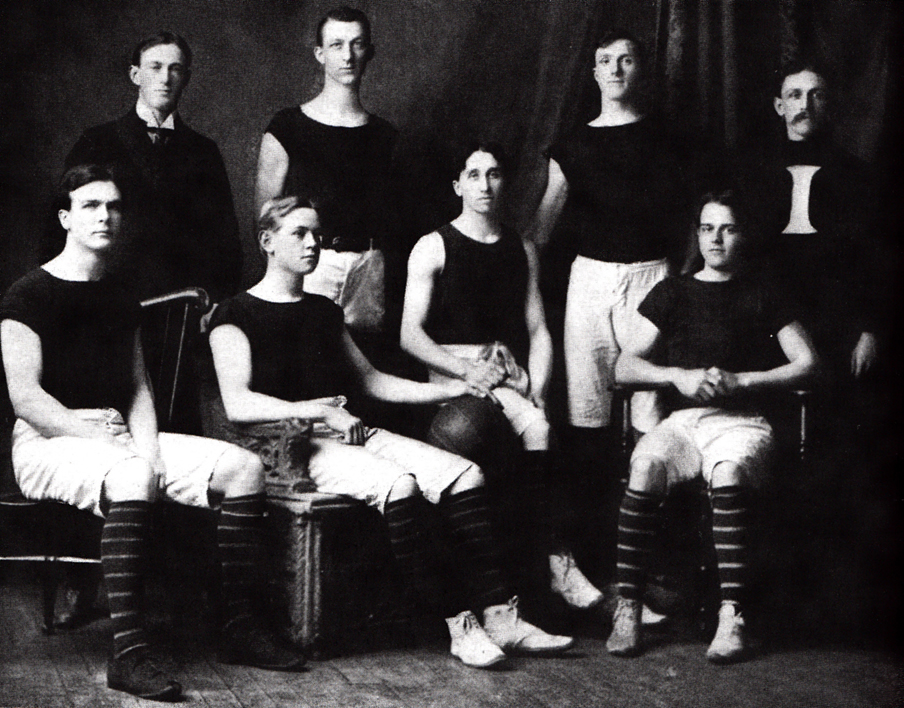
- Conference: Independent
- Record: 1–4
- Head coach: James H. Horne (1st season)
- Captain: Ernest Strange
- Home arena: Old Assembly Hall

1900–01 Western Conference men's basketball standings
	Conf.				Overall
Team	W		L	PCT	W		L	PCT
Purdue†	2	–	0	1.000	12	–	0	1.000
Minnesota	1	–	0	1.000	11	–	1	.917
Wisconsin	0	–	1	.000	1	–	1	.500
Indiana	0	–	2	.000	1	–	4	.200
† Intramural play only; the conference did not have an official championship winner

The 1900–01 Indiana Hoosiers men's basketball team represented Indiana University in its first season of collegiate basketball. The head coach was James H. Horne, who was in his first and only year. The team played its home games at the Old Assembly Hall in Bloomington, Indiana, as an independent school. Indiana did not officially compete in basketball as a member of the Western Conference, later known as the Big Ten Conference, until the 1904–1905 season.

The Hoosiers finished the regular season with an overall record of 1–4.

== Roster ==
Name	Position	Year	Hometown
Guy Cantwell	G	So.	Spencer, Indiana
Phelps Darby	C/F	Fr.	Evansville, Indiana
Jay Fitzgerald	F	Sr.	Clarion, Pennsylvania
Alvah Rucker	G	Jr.	Evansville, Indiana
Ernest Strange	G/F	So.	Arcana, Indiana
Charles Unnewehr	F/C	Jr.	Batesville, Indiana
Earl Walker	F/G	Sr.	Huntington, Indiana

Indiana was led in scoring by sophomore captain Ernest Strange. The 1900–1901 season would be the only one for Strange, who died in a boiler explosion in the summer of 1901. Darby, the starting center, would return for the 1901–1902 season as the team's captain, coach, and leading scorer.

== Schedule ==
Date time, TV	Rank^{#}	Opponent^{#}	Result	Record	Site city, state
Regular season
2/8/1901*		at Butler	L 17–20	0–1	Indianapolis YMCA; Indianapolis, IN
2/21/1901*		Butler	L 20–24	0–2	Old Assembly Hall; Bloomington, IN
3/2/1901*		Purdue; Rivalry	L 15–20	0–3	Old Assembly Hall; Bloomington, IN
3/8/1901*		Wabash	W 26–17	1–3	Old Assembly Hall; Bloomington, IN
3/15/1901*		at Purdue; Rivalry	L 19–23	1–4	Lafayette Coliseum; West Lafayette, IN
*Non-conference game. ^{#}Rankings from AP Poll. (#) Tournament seedings in parentheses.
