= Helms Athletic Foundation =

Sports awards organization

- Abbreviation: HAF
- Successor: LA84 Foundation
- Formation: 1936
- Founders: Paul H. Helms; Willrich R. (Bill) Schroeder
- Purpose: Athletics, Sportsmanship
- Headquarters: Los Angeles
- Awards: Olympic Cup, 1961; Los Angeles Memorial Coliseum Court of Honor; Helms, 1958; Schroeder, 1990; SABR Salute; Schroeder, 1978

The Helms Athletic Foundation, founded in 1936, was a Los Angeles-based organization dedicated to the promotion of athletics and sportsmanship. Paul H. Helms was the organization's founder and benefactor, funding the foundation via his ownership of Helms Bakery. Bill Schroeder founded the organization with Helms and served as its managing director. The men were united in a love of amateur athletic competition.

The organization became well known for presenting awards and trophies for local, national, and international competition, naming the Southern California Player of the Month and Year, national championships in college basketball and college football, Rose Bowl Player of the Game, Coach of the Year, Pacific Coast football player of the year, and other such awards for athletic achievement. Schroeder described himself in 1967 as a "committee of one" in selecting the championship teams. The organization dedicated Helms Hall in 1948, which housed a museum for sporting artifacts as well as the Helms Hall of Fame.

Following the death of Paul Helms in 1957 and the eventual closure of Helms Bakery in 1969, Schroeder sought new benefactors. The organization continued under a series of new sponsors as the United Savings–Helms Athletic Foundation, Citizens Savings Athletic Foundation, and First Interstate Bank Athletic Foundation. Schroeder died in 1987. Under the direction of Peter Ueberroth the Helms Athletic Foundation collection, library, and archives were absorbed into the Amateur Athletic Foundation of Los Angeles, later renamed the LA84 Foundation.

== History ==
=== Founding ===
Schroeder brought to the partnership a large personal collection of sports memorabilia. He sought a corporate sponsor to finance a hall of fame to house his collection and to present awards to local athletes.

The idea was taken seriously by Paul Helms, who was himself invested in athletics both personally and professionally. The bakery with which he made his fortune was a sponsor of the 1932 Los Angeles Olympics, and "Helms Olympic Bread" continued to be associated with the competition. The organization was originally known as the Helms Olympic Athletic Foundation.

In 1936, with Helms' backing, Schroeder set to work from a rented office in downtown Los Angeles. As the organization's only employee, he issued frequent announcements of the selections he made for the Helms Athletic Foundation's various and numerous awards.

=== Helms Hall ===
The organization dedicated Helms Hall in 1948. The purpose-built building adjacent to Helms Bakery near Culver City housed a museum for the sports artifacts originally collected by Schroeder, as well as the Helms Hall of Fame.

Schroeder selected the organization's national champion teams and made All-America team selections in a number of college sports, including football and basketball. The Helms Foundation also operated a hall of fame for both college basketball and college football. Besides collegiate athletics, the organization operated halls of fame for professional football, Major League Baseball, the Pacific Coast League, basketball, fencing, golf, tennis, swimming, auto racing, track and field, and soaring.

=== Later years ===
After Paul Helms' death in 1957, his family continued supporting the organization until 1969, when the bakeries went out of business. Schroeder found a new benefactor in United Savings & Loan, and the organization's name became United Savings–Helms Athletic Foundation. United merged with Citizens Savings & Loan in 1973, when the organization became the Citizens Savings Athletic Foundation. Schroeder's collection was moved to the bottom floor of the organization's offices near Los Angeles International Airport. The firm was again renamed in 1982 when First Interstate Bank assumed sponsorship, and it became the First Interstate Bank Athletic Foundation. The museum moved to the Eugene W. Britt House in 1984.

When the Helms Foundation dissolved, its historical holdings were absorbed into the collection of the Amateur Athletic Foundation, renamed the LA84 Foundation in 2007.

== National championship selections ==
=== Basketball ===
Helms Athletic Foundation national champions in college basketball selections for 1900–01 through 1918–19 were published retroactively in 1957. Those from 1919–20 through 1941–42 were selected retroactively in 1943.

The Helms Foundation began releasing Schroeder's national championship selections for college basketball in 1943, when in February 1943 it published his retroactive picks for the national champion for each year from the 1919–20 through 1941–42 seasons. Later in 1943, Schroeder picked a national basketball champion for the 1942–43 season, and he continued to select national basketball champions for the Helms Foundation annually through the 1981–82 season, its final year of selections. In 1957, the Helms Foundation also released Schroeder's retroactive picks for the college basketball champions for the 1900–1901 through 1918–19 seasons. The retroactive Helms national championships from 1900–01 through 1941–42 were the opinions of one person about teams that played during an era when, due to factors outside their control (e.g., minimal schedules, lack of intersectional play, differing rule interpretations, minimal statistics), it is difficult to know or assess the relative strength of the teams.

The National Invitation Tournament began play in 1938 and the NCAA tournament in 1939; until at the least the mid-1950s, the NIT was widely considered the more prestigious of the two. When Schroeder made his first set of retroactive championship picks in February 1943, he chose the NIT winner as the national champion for 1938 and 1939; for 1940, he chose USC (which won neither tournament that year); and for 1941 and 1942 he chose the NCAA Tournament winners as the national champion. After he began making annual picks in 1943, he selected the NCAA Tournament winner in every year except 1944 (when he picked undefeated Army, which won neither tournament) and 1954 (when he picked undefeated Kentucky, which won neither tournament). Thus, through the final Helms selection in 1982, NCAA Tournament winners Oregon (1939), Indiana (1940), Utah (1944), and La Salle (1954) were the only NCAA champions that were not also Helms champions. Some schools claim a Helms selection as a national championship. (Note: "A 'championship' is something that is won, most generally on the field of play against direct competition. A 'title' is something that is given or awarded by someone else, in honor of an achievement or as a designation of being considered the best at something. While it is generally true that winning a championship also involves a title being associated with it, the converse does not always hold. In many cases, a title can be given without a formal championship or competition being held at all. In other words, being awarded a title does not necessarily confer that a championship was even present much less attained. In earlier years of collegiate basketball, there are many titles that can be claimed, some which are associated with winning a tournament (e.g. NCAA Tournament or NIT) and some which are not (Associated Press #1, highest attendance, top Sagarin Rating). The latter do not constitute a championship. It is into this group that the Helms title falls." — Jon Scott, BigBlueHistory.net)

Year	Team	Record
National Collegiate Champions (Part I, published 1957)
1900–01	Yale	10–4
1901–02	Minnesota	15–0
1902–03	Yale	15–1
1903–04	Columbia	17–1
1904–05	Columbia	19–1
1905–06	Dartmouth	16–2
1906–07	Chicago	21–2
1907–08	Chicago	23–2
1908–09	Chicago	12–0
1909–10	Columbia	11–1
1910–11	St. John's	14–0
1911–12	Wisconsin	15–0
1912–13	Navy	9–0
1913–14	Wisconsin	15–0
1914–15	Illinois	16–0
1915–16	Wisconsin	20–1
1916–17	Washington State	25–1
1917–18	Syracuse	16–1
1918–19	Minnesota	13–0
National Collegiate Champions (Part II, published February 1943)
1919–20	Penn	21–1
1920–21	Penn	21–2
1921–22	Kansas	16–2
1922–23	Kansas	17–1
1923–24	North Carolina	26–0
1924–25	Princeton	21–2
1925–26	Syracuse	19–1
1926–27	Notre Dame	19–1
1927–28	Pittsburgh	21–0
1928–29	Montana State	36–2
1929–30	Pittsburgh	23–2
1930–31	Northwestern	16–1
1931–32	Purdue	17–1
1932–33	Kentucky	21–3
1933–34	Wyoming	26–4
1934–35	NYU	19–1
1935–36	Notre Dame	22-2-1
1936–37	Stanford	25–2
1937–38	Temple	23–2
1938–39	Long Island	23-0
1939–40	USC	20–3
1940–41	Wisconsin	20–3
1941–42	Stanford	27–4
Contemporary annual selections
1942–43	Wyoming	31–2
1943–44	Army	15–0
1944–45	Oklahoma A&M	27–4
1945–46	Oklahoma A&M	31–2
1946–47	Holy Cross	27–3
1947–48	Kentucky	36–3
1948–49	Kentucky	32–2
1949–50	CCNY	24–5
1950–51	Kentucky	32–2
1951–52	Kansas	28–3
1952–53	Indiana	23–3
1953–54	Kentucky	25–0
1954–55	San Francisco	28–1
1955–56	San Francisco	29–0
1956–57	North Carolina	32–0
1957–58	Kentucky	23–6
1958–59	California	25–4
1959–60	Ohio State	25–3
1960–61	Cincinnati	27–3
1961–62	Cincinnati	29–2
1962–63	Loyola (IL)	29–2
1963–64	UCLA	30–0
1964–65	UCLA	28–2
1965–66	Texas Western	28–1
1966–67	UCLA	30–0
1967–68	UCLA	29–1
1968–69	UCLA	29–1
1969–70	UCLA	28–2
1970–71	UCLA	29–1
1971–72	UCLA	30–0
1972–73	UCLA	30–0
1973–74	NC State	30–1
1974–75	UCLA	28-3
1975–76	Indiana	32–0
1976–77	Marquette	25–7
1977–78	Kentucky	30–2
1978–79	Michigan State	26–6
1979–80	Louisville	33–3
1980–81	Indiana	26–9
1981–82	North Carolina	32–2

=== Football ===
The NCAA recognizes the Helms Athletic Foundation as a "major selector" of college football national championships in their official records book.

The champions for 1883 through 1941 were published in August 1942.

Year	Team	Record
Retrospective selections (1942)
1883	Yale	8–0
1884	Yale	8–0–1
1885	Princeton	9–0
1886	Yale	9–0–1
1887	Yale	9–0
1888	Yale	13–0
1889	Princeton	10–0
1890	Harvard	11–0
1891	Yale	13–0
1892	Yale	13–0
1893	Princeton	11–0
1894	Yale	16–0
1895	Penn	14–0
1896	Princeton	10–0–1
1897	Penn	15–0
1898	Harvard	11–0
1899	Harvard	10–0–1
1900	Yale	12–0
1901	Michigan	11–0
1902	Michigan	11–0
1903	Princeton	11–0
1904	Penn	12–0
1905	Chicago	11–0
1906	Princeton	9–0–1
1907	Yale	9–0–1
1908	Penn	11–0–1
1909	Yale	10–0
1910	Harvard	8–0–1
1911	Princeton	8–0–2
1912	Harvard	9–0
1913	Harvard	9–0
1914	Army	9–0
1915	Cornell	9–0
1916	Pittsburgh	8–0
1917	Georgia Tech	9–0
1918	Pittsburgh	4–1
1919	Harvard	9–0–1
1920	California	9–0
1921	Cornell	8–0
1922	Cornell	8–0
1923	Illinois	8–0
1924	Notre Dame	10–0
1925	Alabama	10–0
1926	Alabama; Stanford	9–0–1; 10–0–1
1927	Illinois	7–0–1
1928	Georgia Tech	10–0
1929	Notre Dame	9–0
1930	Notre Dame	10–0
1931	USC	10–1
1932	USC	10–0
1933	Michigan	7–0–1
1934	Minnesota	8–0
1935	Minnesota	8–0
1936	Minnesota	7–1
1937	California	10–0–1
1938	TCU	11–0
1939	Texas A&M	11–0
1940	Stanford	10–0
1941	Minnesota	8–0
Contemporary annual selections
1942	Wisconsin	8–1–1
1943	Notre Dame	9–1
1944	Army	9–0
1945	Army	9–0
1946	Army; Notre Dame	9–0–1; 8–0–1
1947	Notre Dame; Michigan	9–0; 10–0
1948	Michigan	9–0
1949	Notre Dame	10–0
1950	Oklahoma	10–1
1951	Michigan State	9–0
1952	Michigan State	9–0
1953	Notre Dame	9–0–1
1954	UCLA; Ohio State	9–0; 10–0
1955	Oklahoma	11–0
1956	Oklahoma	10–0
1957	Auburn	10–0
1958	LSU	11–0
1959	Syracuse	11–0
1960	Washington	10–1
1961	Alabama	11–0
1962	USC	11–0
1963	Texas	11–0
1964	Arkansas	11–0
1965	Michigan State	10–1
1966	Notre Dame; Michigan State	9–0–1; 9–0–1
1967	USC	10–1
1968	Ohio State	10–0
1969	Texas	11–0
1970	Nebraska	11–0–1
1971	Nebraska	13–0
1972	USC	12–0
1973	Notre Dame	11–0
1974	Oklahoma; USC	11–0; 10–1–1
1975	Ohio State; Oklahoma	11–1; 11–1
1976	Pittsburgh	12–0
1977	Notre Dame	11–1
1978	Alabama; Oklahoma; USC	11–1; 11–1; 12–1
1979	Alabama	12–0
1980	Georgia	12–0
1981	Clemson	12–0
1982	Penn State; SMU	11–1; 11–0–1

- Teams listed in italics indicate retroactively applied championships.

== Pro Football Hall of Fame ==
Helms Athletic Foundation selected players, coaches and administrators from 1950 through at least the 1970s to its pro football hall of fame. Contrary to other halls of fame, some members were selected during their active playing/coaching careers.

Year	Inductee	Pro Team(s)	Contribution	Pro Football Hall of Fame?
1950	Cliff Battles	Boston Braves / Boston Redskins / Washington Redskins (1932–1937)	Player	Yes
1950	Sammy Baugh	Washington Redskins (1937–1952)	Player	Yes
1950	Joe F. Carr	NFL President (1921–1939)	Contributor	Yes
1950	Dutch Clark	Portsmouth Spartans / Detroit Lions (1931–1932; 1934–1938)	Player	Yes
1950	Paddy Driscoll	Hammond All-Stars (1917); Hammond Pros (1919); Racine / Chicago Cardinals (1920–1925); Chicago Bears (1926–1929)	Player	Yes
1950	Turk Edwards	Boston Braves / Boston Redskins / Washington Redskins (1932–1940)	Player	Yes
1950	Ray Flaherty	Los Angeles Wildcats (1926); New York Yankees (1927–1928); New York Giants (1929, 1931–1935)	Player	Yes
1950	Dan Fortmann	Chicago Bears (1936–1943)	Player	Yes
1950	Red Grange	Chicago Bears (1925, 1929–1934); New York Yankees (1926–1927)	Player	Yes
1950	George Halas	Decatur Staleys / Chicago Staleys / Chicago Bears (1920–1929, 1933–1942, 1946–1955, 1958–1967)	Coach	Yes
1950	Mel Hein	New York Giants (1931–1945)	Player	Yes
1950	Bill Hewitt	Chicago Bears (1932−1936); Philadelphia Eagles (1937−1939); Steagles (1943)	Player	Yes
1950	Clarke Hinkle	Green Bay Packers (1932–1941)	Player	Yes
1950	Cal Hubbard	New York Giants (1927–1928, 1936); Green Bay Packers (1929–1933, 1935); Pittsburgh Pirates (1936)	Player	Yes
1950	Don Hutson	Green Bay Packers (1935–1945)	Player	Yes
1950	Curly Lambeau	Green Bay Packers (1920–1949)	Coach	Yes
1950	Tuffy Leemans	New York Giants (1936–1943)	Player	Yes
1950	Sid Luckman	Chicago Bears (1939–1950)	Player	Yes
1950	Bronko Nagurski	Chicago Bears (1930–1937, 1943)	Player	Yes
1950	Ernie Nevers	Duluth Eskimos (1926–1927); Chicago Cardinals (1929–1931)	Player	Yes
1950	Steve Owen	New York Giants (1931–1949)	Coach	Yes
1950	Ken Strong	Staten Island Stapletons (1929–1932); New York Giants (1933–1935, 1939, 1944–1947); New York Yankees (1936–1937); Jersey City Giants (1938, 1940)	Player	Yes
1950	Joe Stydahar	Chicago Bears (1936–1942, 1945–1946)	Player	Yes
1950	Jim Thorpe	Canton Bulldogs (1915–1917, 1919–1920, 1926); Cleveland Indians (1921); Oorang Indians (1922–1923); Rock Island Independents (1924, 1925); New York Giants (1925); Tampa Cardinals (1926); Chicago Cardinals (1928)	Player	Yes
1950	George Trafton	Decatur Staleys / Chicago Staleys / Chicago Bears (1920–1921, 1923–1932)	Player	Yes
1951	Pete Henry	Canton Bulldogs (1920–1923, 1925–1926); New York Giants (1927); Pottsville Maroons (1927–1928)	Player	Yes
1951	Arnie Herber	Green Bay Packers (1930–1940); New York Giants (1944–1945)	Player	Yes
1951	Johnny Blood	Milwaukee Badgers (1925–1926); Duluth Eskimos (1926–1927); Pottsville Maroons (1928); Green Bay Packers (1929–1933, 1935–1936); Pittsburgh Pirates (1934, 1937–1938); Buffalo Tigers (1941)	Player	Yes
1951	Bulldog Turner	Chicago Bears (1940–1952)	Player	Yes
1952	Greasy Neale	Philadelphia Eagles (1941–1950)	Coach	Yes
1952	Al Nesser	Columbus Panhandles (1910–1919, 1921); Canton Professionals (1914); Akron Pros / Akron Indians (1920–1925; 1926); Cleveland Bulldogs (1925); Cleveland Panthers (1926); New York Giants (1926–1928); Cleveland Indians (1931)	Player	No
1952	Alex Wojciechowicz	Detroit Lions (1938–1946); Philadelphia Eagles (1946–1950)	Player	Yes
1952	Frankie Albert	Los Angeles Bulldogs (1945); San Francisco 49ers (1946–1952)	Player	No
1952	Bob Waterfield	Cleveland / Los Angeles Rams (1945–1952)	Player	Yes
1956	Tom Fears	Los Angeles Rams (1948–1956)	Player	Yes
1956	Otto Graham	Cleveland Browns (1946–1955)	Player	Yes
1956	Steve Van Buren	Philadelphia Eagles (1944–1951)	Player	Yes
1957	Tony Canadeo	Green Bay Packers (1941–1944, 1946–1952)	Player	Yes
1957	Lou Groza	Cleveland Browns (1946–1959, 1961–1967)	Player	Yes
1957	Elroy Hirsch	Chicago Rockets (1946–1948); Los Angeles Rams (1949–1957)	Player	Yes
1957	Ed Sprinkle	Chicago Bears (1944–1955)	Player	Yes
1957	Doak Walker	Detroit Lions (1950–1955)	Player	Yes
1959	Ray Bray	Chicago Bears (1939–1942, 1946–1951); Green Bay Packers (1952)	Player	No
1959	Charlie Conerly	New York Giants (1948–1961)	Player	No
1959	George Preston Marshall	Washington Redskins owner (1932–1965)	Contributor	Yes
1959	George Musso	Chicago Bears (1933–1944)	Player	Yes
1960 (Note: Class of 1960 selections were named in January 1961.)	Chuck Bednarik	Philadelphia Eagles (1949–1962)	Player	Yes
1960	Jim Benton	Cleveland / Los Angeles Rams (1938–1940, 1942; 1944–1947); Chicago Bears (1943)	Player	No
1960	Bill Dudley	Pittsburgh Steelers (1942, 1945–1946); Detroit Lions (1947–1949); Washington Redskins (1950–1951, 1953)	Player	Yes
1960	Link Lyman	Canton / Cleveland Bulldogs (1922–1925); Frankford Yellow Jackets (1925); Chicago Bears (1926–1928, 1930–1931, 1933–1934)	Player	Yes
1960	George McAfee	Chicago Bears (1940–1941, 1945–1950)	Player	Yes
1960	Buck Shaw	San Francisco 49ers (1946–1954); Philadelphia Eagles (1958–1960)	Coach	No
1960	Y. A. Tittle	Baltimore Colts (1948–1950); San Francisco 49ers (1951–1960); New York Giants (1961–1964)	Player	Yes
1960	Emlen Tunnell	New York Giants (1948–1958); Green Bay Packers (1959–1961)	Player	Yes
1960	Norm Van Brocklin	Los Angeles Rams (1949–1957); Philadelphia Eagles (1958–1960)	Player	Yes
1961	Ben Agajanian	Philadelphia Eagles (1945); Pittsburgh Steelers (1945); Los Angeles Dons (1947–1948); New York Giants (1949, 1954–1957); Los Angeles Rams (1953); Los Angeles Chargers / San Diego Chargers (1960; 1964); Dallas Texans (1961); Green Bay Packers (1961); Oakland Raiders (1962)	Player	No
1961	Bucko Kilroy	Steagles (1943); Philadelphia Eagles (1944–1955)	Player	No
1961	Joe Perry	San Francisco 49ers (1948–1960, 1963); Baltimore Colts (1961–1962)	Player	Yes
1961	Pete Pihos	Philadelphia Eagles (1947–1955)	Player	Yes
1962	Bert Bell	Philadelphia Eagles owner (1933–1940); Pittsburgh Steelers co-owner (1940–1946)	Contributor	Yes
1962	Charles Bidwill	Chicago Cardinals owner (1933–1947)	Contributor	Yes
1962	Walt Kiesling	Duluth Eskimos (1926–1927); Pottsville Maroons (1928); Chicago Cardinals (1929–1933); Chicago Bears (1934); Green Bay Packers (1935–1936); Pittsburgh Pirates (1937–1938)	Player	Yes
1962	Tim Mara	New York Giants owner (1925–1959)	Contributor	Yes
1962	Vic Sears	Philadelphia Eagles (1941–1942, 1944–1953); Phil-Pit Steagles (1943)	Player	No
1962	Carl Storck	NFL President (1939–1941)	Contributor	No
1963	Gene Brito	Washington Redskins (1951–1953, 1955–1958); Los Angeles Rams (1959–1960)	Player	No
1963	Paul Brown	Cleveland Browns (1946–1962); Cincinnati Bengals (1968–1975)	Coach	Yes
1963	Jim Martin	Cleveland Browns (1950); Detroit Lions (1951–1961); Baltimore Colts (1963); Washington Redskins (1964)	Player	No
1963	Dan Reeves (Note: Reeves also received a "special award" for his "contribution to professional football in Los Angeles" during the 1950 inaugural class ceremony, but wasn't inducted at the time.)	Cleveland / Los Angeles Rams owner (1941–1971)	Contributor	Yes
1964	Jimmy Conzelman	Decatur Staleys (1920); Rock Island Independents (1921–1922); Milwaukee Badgers (1922–1924); Detroit Panthers (1925–1926); Providence Steam Roller (1927–1929)	Player	Yes
1964	Bobby Layne	Chicago Bears (1948); New York Bulldogs (1949); Detroit Lions (1950–1958); Pittsburgh Steelers (1958–1962)	Player	Yes
1964	Eddie LeBaron	Washington Redskins (1952–1953, 1955–1959); Dallas Cowboys (1960–1963)	Player	No
1964	Gino Marchetti	Dallas Texans (1952); Baltimore Colts (1953–1964, 1966)	Player	Yes
1964	Leo Nomellini	San Francisco 49ers (1950–1963)	Player	Yes
1964	Ray Renfro	Cleveland Browns (1952–1963)	Player	No
1964	Andy Robustelli	Los Angeles Rams (1951–1955); New York Giants (1956–1964)	Player	Yes
1965	Bruno Banducci	Philadelphia Eagles (1944–1945); San Francisco 49ers (1946–1954)	Player	No
1965	Art Donovan	Baltimore Colts (1950); New York Yanks (1951); Dallas Texans (1952); Baltimore Colts (1953–1961)	Player	Yes
1965	Hugh McElhenny	San Francisco 49ers (1952–1960); Minnesota Vikings (1961–1962); New York Giants (1963); Detroit Lions (1964)	Player	Yes
1966	Frank Gifford	New York Giants (1952–1960, 1962–1964)	Player	Yes
1966	Ollie Matson	Chicago Cardinals (1952–1958); Los Angeles Rams (1959–1962); Detroit Lions (1963); Philadelphia Eagles (1964–1966)	Player	Yes
1966	Kyle Rote	New York Giants (1951–1961)	Player	No
1966	Bob St. Clair	San Francisco 49ers (1953–1963)	Player	Yes
1966	Buddy Parker	Chicago Cardinals (1949); Detroit Lions (1951–1956); Pittsburgh Steelers (1957–1964)	Coach	No
1967	Jon Arnett	Los Angeles Rams (1957–1963); Chicago Bears (1964–1966)	Player	No
1967	Jim Brown	Cleveland Browns (1957–1965)	Player	Yes
1967	Art Hunter	Green Bay Packers (1954–1955); Cleveland Browns (1956–1959); Los Angeles Rams (1960–1964); Pittsburgh Steelers (1965)	Player	No
1967	Alex Webster	New York Giants (1955–1964)	Player	No
1967	Fred Williams	Chicago Bears (1952–1963); Washington Redskins (1964–1965)	Player	No
1969	Jack Manders	Chicago Bears (1933–1940)	Player	No
1969	Marion Motley	Cleveland Browns (1946–1953); Pittsburgh Steelers (1955)	Player	Yes
1969	Don Paul	Los Angeles Rams (1948–1955)	Player	No
1969	Les Richter	Los Angeles Rams (1954–1962)	Player	Yes
1969	Ernie Stautner	Pittsburgh Steelers (1950–1963)	Player	Yes
1969	Buddy Young	New York Yankees (1947–1949); New York Yanks (1950–1951); Dallas Texans (1952); Baltimore Colts (1953–1955)	Player	No
1969	Paul "Tank" Younger	Los Angeles Rams (1949–1957); Pittsburgh Steelers (1958)	Player	No
1971	Vince Lombardi	Green Bay Packers (1959–1967); Washington Redskins (1969)	Coach	Yes
1971	Charley Trippi	Chicago Cardinals (1947–1955)	Player	Yes
1972	Eddie Meador	Los Angeles Rams (1959–1970)	Player	No
1972	Tobin Rote	Green Bay Packers (1950–1956); Detroit Lions (1957–1959); San Diego Chargers (1963–1964); Denver Broncos (1966)	Player	No
1973	Lance Alworth	San Diego Chargers (1962–1970); Dallas Cowboys (1971–1972)	Player	Yes
1973	Raymond Berry	Baltimore Colts (1955–1967)	Player	Yes
1973	Forrest Gregg	Green Bay Packers (1956, 1958–1970); Dallas Cowboys (1971)	Player	Yes
1973	Jim Ringo	Green Bay Packers (1953–1963); Philadelphia Eagles (1964–1967)	Player	Yes
1973	Joe Schmidt	Detroit Lions (1953–1965)	Player	Yes
1973	Bart Starr	Green Bay Packers (1956–1971)	Player	Yes
1973	Larry Wilson	St. Louis Cardinals (1960–1972)	Player	Yes
1975	Doug Atkins	Cleveland Browns (1953–1954); Chicago Bears (1955–1966); New Orleans Saints (1967–1969)	Player	Yes
1975	Gino Cappelletti	Boston Patriots (1960–1970)	Player	No
1975	Marlin McKeever	Los Angeles Rams (1961–1966, 1971–1972); Minnesota Vikings (1967); Washington Redskins (1968–1970); Philadelphia Eagles (1973)	Player	No
1975	Dick Modzelewski	Washington Redskins (1953–1954); Pittsburgh Steelers (1955); New York Giants (1956–1963); Cleveland Browns (1964–1966)	Player	No
1975	Ray Nitschke	Green Bay Packers (1958–1972)	Player	Yes
1975	Johnny Unitas	Baltimore Colts (1956–1972); San Diego Chargers (1973)	Player	Yes
1975	Maxie Baughan	Philadelphia Eagles (1960–1965); Los Angeles Rams (1966–1970); Washington Redskins (1974)	Player	No
1975	John Brodie	San Francisco 49ers (1957–1973)	Player	No
1975	Bill George	Chicago Bears (1952–1965); Los Angeles Rams (1966)	Player	Yes
1975	Rosey Grier	New York Giants (1955–1962); Los Angeles Rams (1963–1966)	Player	No
1975	Deacon Jones	Los Angeles Rams (1961–1971); San Diego Chargers (1972–1973); Washington Redskins (1974)	Player	Yes
1975	Bruiser Kinard	Brooklyn Dodgers / Tigers (1938–1944); New York Yankees (1946–1947)	Player	Yes
1975	Night Train Lane	Los Angeles Rams (1952–1953); Chicago Cardinals (1954–1959); Detroit Lions (1960–1965)	Player	Yes
1975	Mike Michalske	New York Yankees (1926–1928); Green Bay Packers (1929–1935, 1937)	Player	Yes
1975	Jim Parker	Baltimore Colts (1957–1967)	Player	Yes
1976	George Blanda	Chicago Bears (1949, 1950–1958); Baltimore Colts (1950); Houston Oilers (1960–1966); Oakland Raiders (1967–1975)	Player	Yes
1976	Len Ford	Los Angeles Dons (1948–1949); Cleveland Browns (1950–1957); Green Bay Packers (1958)	Player	Yes
1976	Sonny Jurgensen	Philadelphia Eagles (1957–1963); Washington Redskins (1964–1974)	Player	Yes
1976	Bob Lilly	Dallas Cowboys (1961–1974)	Player	Yes
1976	Lenny Moore	Baltimore Colts (1956–1967)	Player	Yes
1976	Joe Scibelli	Los Angeles Rams (1961–1975)	Player	No
1976	Jim Taylor	Green Bay Packers (1958–1966); New Orleans Saints (1967)	Player	Yes
19??	Rosey Brown	New York Giants (1953–1965)	Player	Yes

== World Trophy ==
The Helms World Trophy, originally known as the Helms Award and also referred to as the Helms Trophy, was an annual sporting award established by the Helms Athletic Foundation from 1939 to honor the foremost amateur athlete of each continent of the world, including Africa, Asia, Australia, Europe, North America, and South America.

Although the Foundation was established in 1936, the awards date back to the 1896, the year of the first Summer Olympics.

After the initial committee selection, amateur athletes were nominated by their own countries for consideration by the foundation. Winners were presented with a silver plaque and had their names added to the World Trophy that was located at the Helms Foundation, and subsequently the Amateur Athletic Foundation of Los Angeles (now known as the LA84 Foundation). Winners can only win the award once.

=== Winners ===
- World Trophy for Australasia
- World Trophy for Africa
  - 1965: Seraphino Antao, Kenyan sprinter
- World Trophy for Asia
  - 1930: Simeon Toribio, Filipino high jumper
  - 1953: K. D. Singh, Indian hockey player
  - 1959: Milkha Singh, Indian sprinter
  - 1966: Ramanathan Krishnan, Indian tennis player
- World Trophy for Europe
  - 1969: Jean-Claude Killy, French skier
- World Trophy for North America
- World Trophy for South America

== See also ==
- Mythical national championship
- College football national championships in NCAA Division I FBS
- Premo-Porretta Power Poll
- Helms Foundation College Basketball Player of the Year
