= 1900–01 Purdue Boilermakers men's basketball team =

American college basketball season

1900–01 Purdue Boilermakers men's basketball
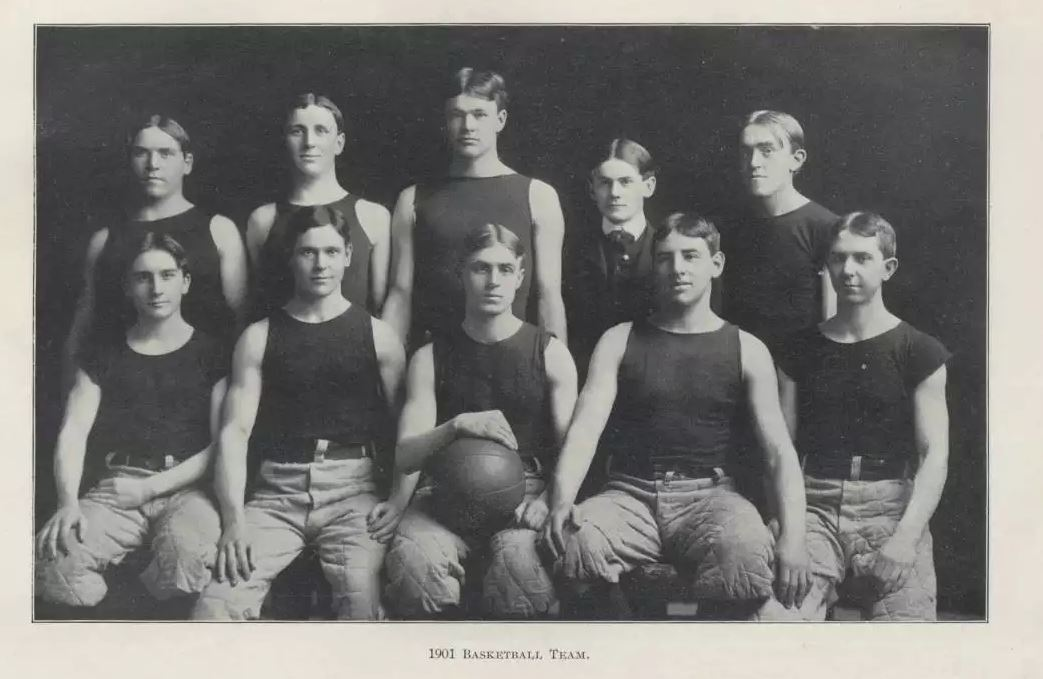
- Conference: Independent
- Record: 12–0
- Head coach: Alpha Jamison (2nd season)
- Captain: H. Wallace Reimann
- Home arena: Lafayette Coliseum

1900–01 Western Conference men's basketball standings
	Conf.				Overall
Team	W		L	PCT	W		L	PCT
Purdue†	2	–	0	1.000	12	–	0	1.000
Minnesota	1	–	0	1.000	11	–	1	.917
Wisconsin	0	–	1	.000	1	–	1	.500
Indiana	0	–	2	.000	1	–	4	.200
† Intramural play only; the conference did not have an official championship winner

The 1900–01 Purdue Boilermakers men's basketball team was the first season Purdue University fielded a basketball team. They played a multi-game schedule, and compiled an 12–0 record against Indiana colleges and high schools. The team averaged 30.7 points a game, while holding their opponents to 10 points a game. The team, citing their perfect record, claimed to be state champions. H. Wallace Reimann lead the team as captain and unofficially as coach. William C. Curd Jr. acted as the team's business manager.

== Roster ==
Player	Position	Class
H. Wallace Reimann	Forward	Soph.
Alexander D. Smith	Forward	Soph.
John F. G. Miller	Center	Soph.
D. Ralph Lucas	Guard	Fr.
Joseph B. Knapp	Guard	Fr.
Hugh W. Cook	Sub. Forward	Soph.
William C. Holt	Sub. Guard	Senior
Lloyd M. Lucas	Sub. Guard	Freshman
Hollis H. Arnold	Sub. Guard	Freshman
Dossey M. Lynch	Sub. Forward	Junior

== Games ==
Date time, TV	Opponent	Result	Record	Site city, state
December 18, 1900*	Danville	W 24–4	1–0	Lafayette Coliseum; West Lafayette, IN
January 23, 1901*	Lafayette High School	W 40–7	2–0	Lafayette Coliseum; West Lafayette, IN
January 25, 1901*	at Logansport Community College	W 19–5	3–0	Logansport, IN
February 1, 1901*	at Culver Military Institute	W 19–12	4–0	Culver, IN
February 15, 1901*	Wabash	W 43–15	5–0	Lafayette Coliseum; West Lafayette, IN
March 1, 1901*	at Wabash	W 17–15	6–0	Wabash, IN
March 2, 1901	at Indiana; Rivalry	W 20–15	7–0 (1–0)	Old Assembly Hall; Bloomington, IN
March 11, 1901*	Logansport Community College	W 12–11	8–0	Lafayette Coliseum; West Lafayette, IN
March 12, 1901*	Lafayette High School	W 56–15	9–0	Lafayette Coliseum; West Lafayette, IN
March 13, 1901*	Lafayette High School	W 77–9	10–0	Lafayette Coliseum; West Lafayette, IN
March 15, 1901	Indiana; Rivalry	W 23–19	11–0 (2–0)	Lafayette Coliseum; West Lafayette, IN
March 21, 1901*	Butler	W 41–12	12–0	Lafayette Coliseum; West Lafayette, IN
*Non-conference game. (#) Tournament seedings in parentheses.
