= Elmer Berry =

American athlete and coach (1879–1952)

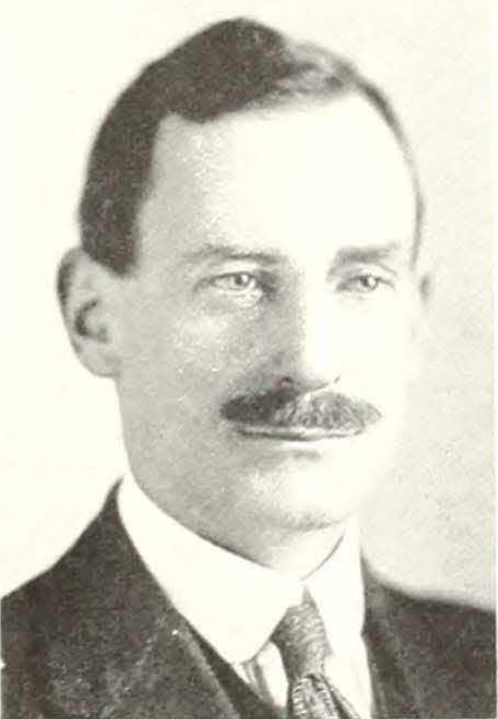
- Berry pictured in The Massasoit 1922, Springfield College yearbook

Biographical details
- Born: October 9, 1879; Davey, Nebraska, U.S.
- Died: April 21, 1952 (aged 72); Vida, Oregon, U.S.

Playing career
- 1901–1902: Springfield

Coaching career (HC unless noted)

Football
- 1917–1921: Springfield

Basketball
- 1900–1901: Nebraska
- 1915–1922: Springfield

Elmer Berry (October 9, 1879 – April 21, 1952) was an American college football and basketball player and coach. He first served as a men's basketball coach at the University of Nebraska in Lincoln, Nebraska during the 1900–01 season.

Berry later served as the head football coach (1917 to 1921) and men's basketball coach (1915 to 1922) at the Springfield YMCA School, now known as Springfield College.

Berry was born on October 9, 1879, in Davey, Nebraska. He died on April 21, 1952, at his home in Vida, Oregon.
