= 1900–01 Vanderbilt Commodores men's basketball team =

American college basketball season

The 1900–01 Vanderbilt Commodores men's basketball team was the first officially sanctioned basketball team at Vanderbilt University. The Commodores played 4 games against the local Nashville Y.M.C.A. team and the Nashville Athletic Club. Despite the older and more experienced competition, Vanderbilt finished 2–2.

== Season summary ==
Since 1893, unofficial games had been played by Vanderbilt teams and intramural basketball games were popular on campus during winter. Finally, in Autumn 1900, a team was formed to accept a challenge from the Nashville Y.M.C.A. to play a 3-game series. As the Old Gym on Vanderbilt's campus was too small to host the spectacle, all three games were played at the Y.M.C.A.'s gym.

Walter Simmons, Earnest Reese, Tom Motlow, Herbert Gannaway and E.L. Woolf were the starters in the first game on December 15, 1900. After trailing 16–4 at halftime, the Commodores outscored the Y 15–4 in the second half to pull within 20–19, before losing 22–19. Vanderbilt routed the Y in the second game in February, 1901 by a score of 24–9. They secured a win in the deciding game in March, 1901 on a late goal 14–12.

The Commodores played the final game of their inaugural season against the Nashville Athletic Club, whose players were older and bigger. After trailing 10–5 at halftime, Walter Simmons, a four-year starter on the football team, led the Commodores back, but NAC won 13–11.

== Head coach and captain ==
W.D. Weatherford was head coach, and Earnest Reese was team captain.

== 1900–01 schedule and results ==
Date	Opponent	Location	Result	Overall	Conf.
Regular Season
December 15, 1900	at Nashville Y.M.C.A.	Nashville, TN	L 19–22	0–1	–
February, 1901	at Nashville Y.M.C.A.	Nashville, TN	W 24–9	1–1	–
March, 1901	at Nashville Y.M.C.A.	Nashville, TN	W 14–12	2–1	–
March, 1901	at Nashville Athletic Club	Nashville, TN	L 11–13	2–2	–
