= 1900–01 Connecticut Aggies men's basketball team =

American college basketball season

1900–01 Connecticut Aggies men's basketball
- Conference: Athletic League of New England State Colleges
- Record: 1–0 (0–0 ALNESC)

The 1900–01 Connecticut Aggies men's basketball team represented Connecticut Agricultural College, now the University of Connecticut, in the 1900–01 collegiate men's basketball season. This was the first year that the school had a basketball team. The Aggies completed the season with a 1–0 record against a local high school.

== Schedule ==
Date time, TV	Rank^{#}	Opponent^{#}	Result	Record	Site (attendance) city, state
Regular Season
*		Windam High School	W 17–12	1–0	
*Non-conference game. ^{#}Rankings from AP Poll. (#) Tournament seedings in parentheses. All times are in Eastern Time.

Schedule Source:
