= RPI Engineers =

Sports teams of Rensselaer Polytechnic Institute

- University: Rensselaer Polytechnic Institute
- Nickname: Engineers
- Association: Division III
- Conference: Liberty League, ECAC Hockey
- Athletic director: Kristie Bowers
- Location: Troy, New York
- Varsity teams: 21
- Football stadium: East Campus Stadium
- Arena: East Campus Arena
- Baseball stadium: Robison Field
- Other venues: Houston Field House
- Colors: Cherry and white
- Mascot: Puckman
- Website: rpiathletics.com

The RPI Engineers are composed of 21 teams representing Rensselaer Polytechnic Institute in intercollegiate athletics, including men and women's basketball, cross country, ice hockey, lacrosse, soccer, swimming & diving, tennis, and track and field. Men's sports include baseball, football, and golf. Women's sports include field hockey, and softball. The Engineers compete in the NCAA Division III and are members of the Liberty League for all sports except ice hockey, which competes in NCAA Division I, as a member of ECAC Hockey.

== History ==
The school's teams were originally nicknamed the "Fighting Engineers" in 1925, likely by a student writing for the paper, and called so due to the energy of the players. In 1995, the nickname of some of the school's teams was officially changed from the Engineers to the Red Hawks; however, the hockey, football, cross-country, tennis and track and field teams all chose to retain the Engineers name. The Red Hawks name was never much liked by the student body; a Red Hawk mascot was frequently taunted by fans who threw objects at him and chanted, "kill the chicken!". Finally, in 2009 the nickname was changed back to Engineers. In contrast, the official ice hockey mascot, Puckman (an anthropomorphic hockey puck with an engineer's helmet) has always been very popular.

During the 1970s and 1980s, one RPI cheer was:

E to the x, dy/dx, E to the x, dx
Cosine, secant, tangent, sine
3.14159
Square root, cube root, log of pi
Disintegrate them, RPI!

== Teams ==
Men's sports	Women's sports
Baseball	Basketball
Basketball	Cross Country
Cross Country	Field Hockey
Football	Ice Hockey
Golf	Lacrosse
Ice Hockey	Soccer
Lacrosse	Softball
Soccer	Swimming & Diving
Swimming & Diving	Tennis
Tennis	Track and Field^{1}
Track and Field^{1}
^{1} – includes both indoor and outdoor

=== Baseball ===
The Engineers baseball squad is perennially atop the Liberty League standings, and has seen eight players move on to the professional ranks, including four players selected in the MLB draft. (No RPI Engineer has played in the majors, but Dave Lohrman and Bill Snyder, who were both drafted in 1997, made it as far as AAA ball.) The team is coached by Karl Steffen (Ithaca '78). The Engineers play their home games at the historic Robison Field.

=== Football ===
The Rensselaer Polytechnic Institute (RPI) Engineers football team competes in the National Collegiate Athletic Association (NCAA) Division III as a member of the Liberty League.

American rugby was played on campus in the late 1870s. Intercollegiate football begin as late as 1886 when an RPI team first played a Union College team at the West Troy Grounds. Since 1903, RPI and nearby Union have been historic rivals in football, making it the oldest such rivalry in the state. The teams have played for the Dutchman's Shoes since 1950. RPI Football had their most successful season in 2003, when they finished 11–2 and lost to St. Johns (Minn.) in the semifinals of the NCAA Division III football tournament.

Notable Alumni include Matt Patricia and Andrew Franks. Matt Patricia played as a center and guard for the Engineers from 1992 to 1995 while earning a degree in aeronautical engineering. He's had a highly successful coaching career including the Defensive coordinator at The New England Patriots, the Head Coach at the Detroit Lions, and the Defensive coordinator at Ohio State. Andrew Franks is a former kicker and transitioned from Division III college football to the NFL, playing for the Miami Dolphins during the 2015 and 2016 seasons.

=== Lacrosse (men's) ===
The origins of RPI men's lacrosse began in the 1930s, when the school had a club team; not much else is known about the team when it was a student run club. In 1942, Ned Harkness began coaching the team after the institution recognized it as a varsity sport. Coach Harkness was working part-time as coach and full-time at a local job in Troy, New York. After one season, Harkness was drafted into the Canadian Air Force, leaving the team until his return in 1945. By this point the 13 man roster had significantly grown, and the team began to compete at the highest level with schools around the country such as Dartmouth, Princeton, West Point, Stevens, Yale, and Williams.

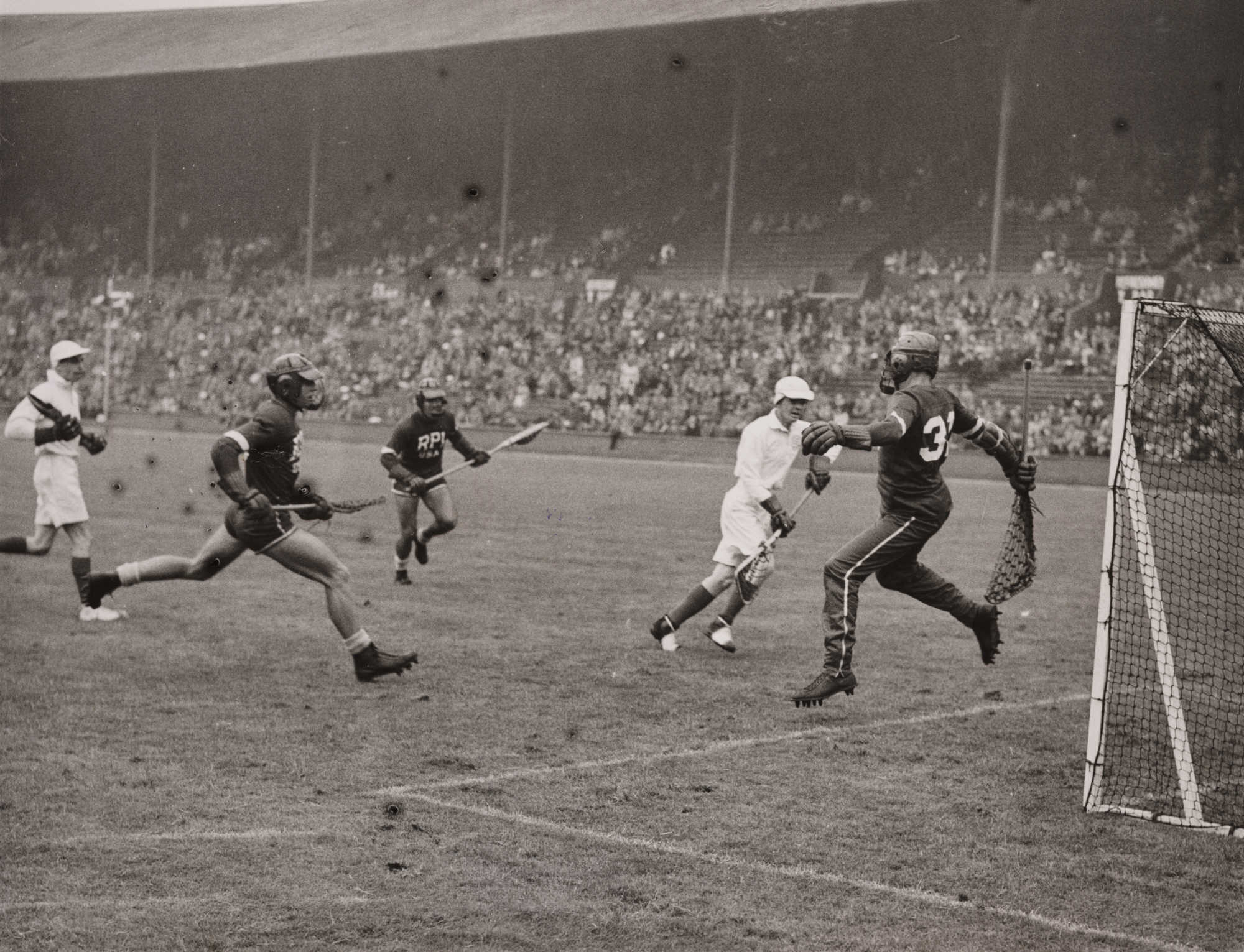
RPI's lacrosse team in a demonstration game at the 1948 London Olympics

The 1948 men's lacrosse team represented the United States in the 1948 Olympics in London. This team was undefeated in the United States that year with a record of 11–0, winning the national championship. The team continued this streak into London to beat several English teams while also playing to a 5–5 tie with the British all star team, winning 7 of the 8 games played, with one tie and no losses. The Olympic Sports committee does not list lacrosse as an official event, so these games were considered exhibition matches. Despite this, the RPI lacrosse team received gold medals from the summer games. This 1948 men's team showed such dedication that, when during a trip on a dilapidated bus to an away game the bus broke down, the team proceeded to push the bus for "miles" before the a towing company arrived to tow the team and the bus the rest of the way to the match (which they won). RPI also won the Wingate Memorial Trophy as national collegiate champions (shared with Virginia) in 1952. Future NHL head coach Ned Harkness coached the lacrosse and ice hockey teams, winning national championships in both sports.

Recently RPI men's lacrosse continues the tradition of the 1948 team by being one of the top division III schools in the nation. The NCAA ranked RPI 17th in the nation before the 2021 season was cancelled due to COVID-19.

=== Track and field ===
The track and field team competes as part of NCAA Division 3 and the Liberty League.

=== Athletic facilities ===
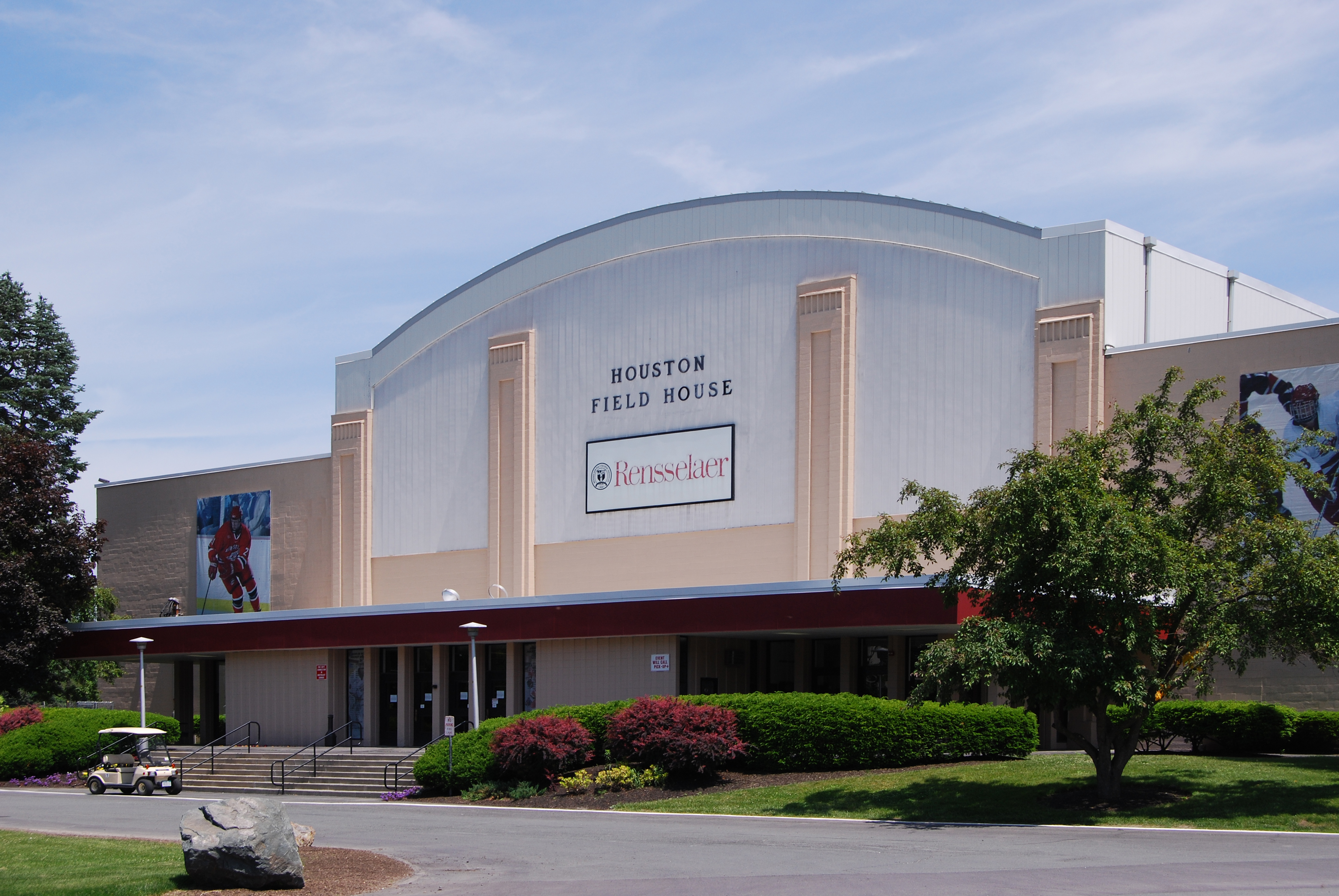
Houston Field House

The Houston Field House is a 4,780‑seat multi-purpose arena located on the RPI campus. It opened in 1949 and is home to the RPI Engineers men's and women's ice hockey teams. The Field House was renovated starting in 2007 as part of the major campus improvement project to build the East Campus Athletic Village. The renovations included locker rooms upgrades, addition of a new weight room, and a new special reception room dedicated to Ned Harkness. Additionally, as part of the renovations through a government grant, solar panels were installed on the roof to supply power to the building.

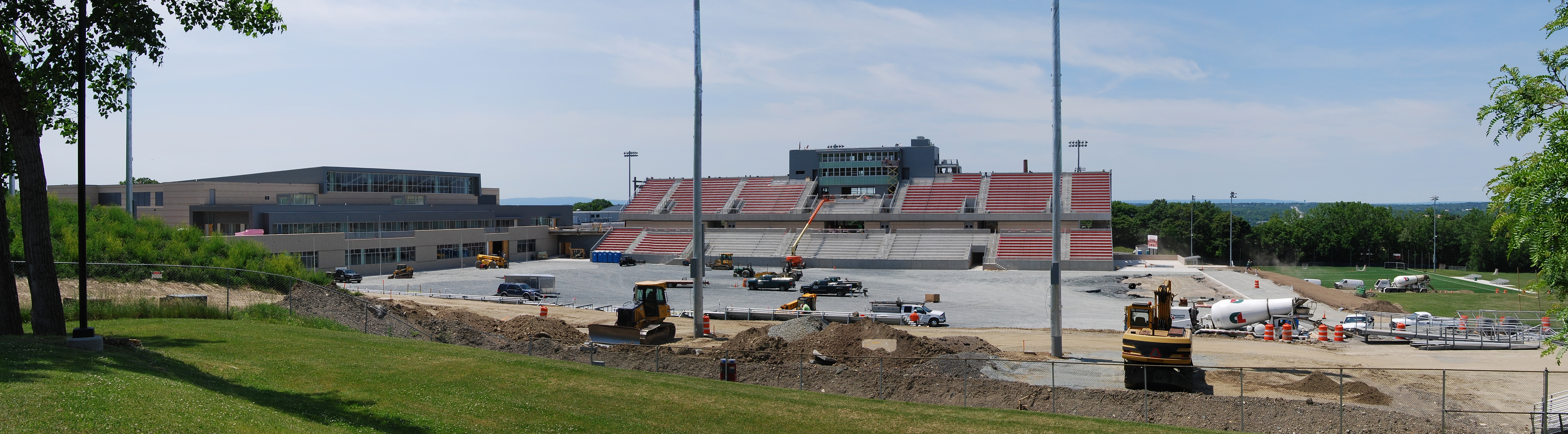
East Campus Athletic Village, under construction

As part of the Rensselaer Plan, the Institute recently completed a major project to improve its athletic facilities with the East Campus Athletic Village. The plan included construction of a new and much larger 4,842‑seat football stadium, a basketball arena with seating for 1,200, a new 50-meter pool, an indoor track and field complex, new tennis courts, new weight rooms and a new sports medicine center. The Institute broke ground on August 26, 2007, and construction of the first phase is expected to last two years.

The estimated cost of the project is $78 million for phase one and $35–$45 million for phase two. Since the completion of the new stadium, the bleachers on the Class of '86 football field on the central campus have been removed and the field has become an open space. In the future the new space could be used for expansions of the academic buildings, but for now members of the campus planning team foresee a "historic landscape with different paths and access ways for students and vehicles alike".
