= Taguan =

Taguan may refer to:

- Flying squirrel (the animal)
- taguan a traditional game of hide-and-seek, as played in the Philippines
- Taguan Mountain, a mountain in Taiwan
