= 1891 in basketball =

The following are the basketball events of the year 1891 throughout the world.

== Events ==
- December 21 – The first game of basketball is played at the Springfield YMCA Training School under the rules of James Naismith.
