= Patintero =

Children's game in the Philippines

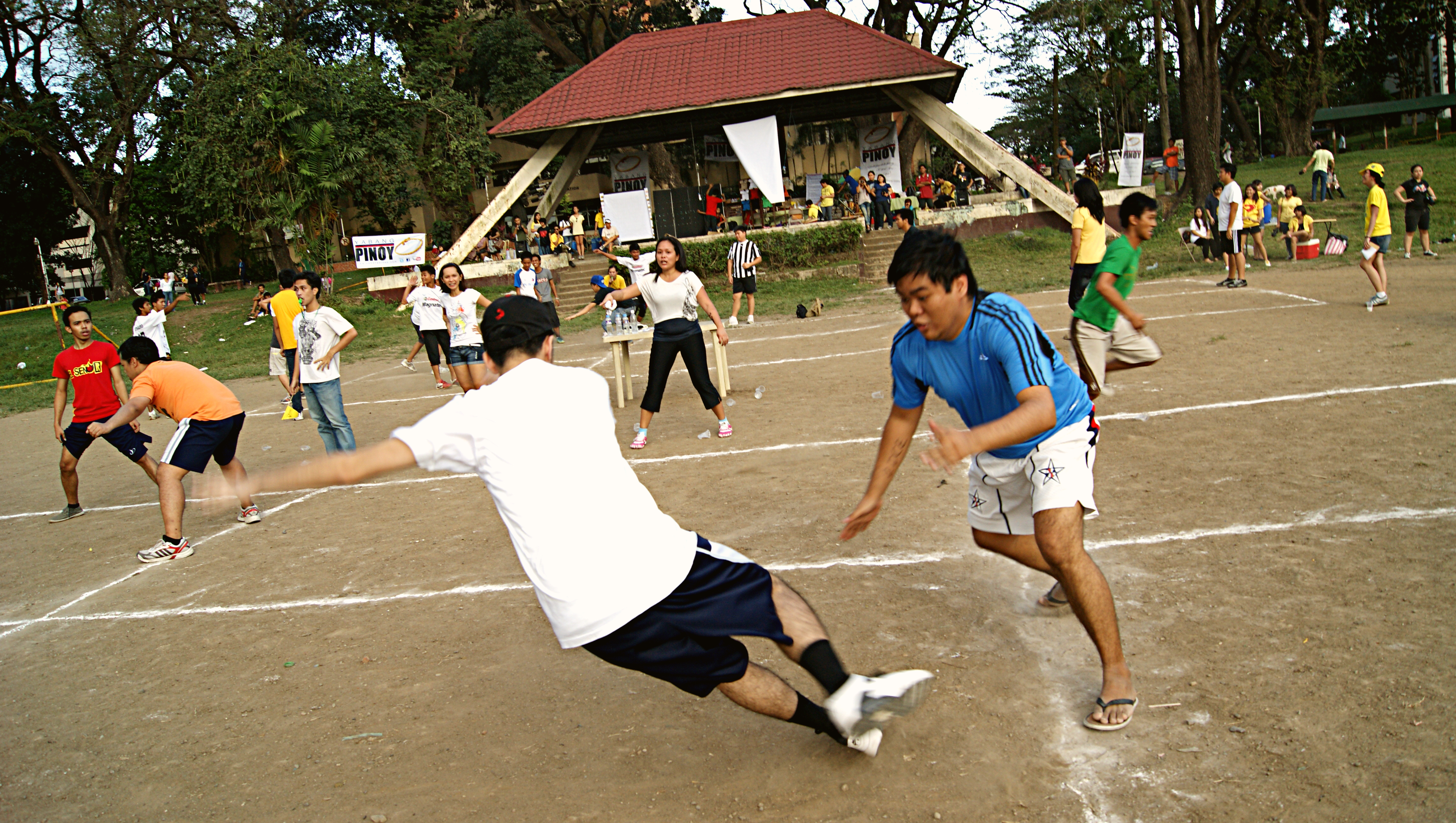
People playing patintero

Patintero, also known as harangang-taga or tubigan, (Intl. Translate: Escape from the hell or Block the runner) is a Filipino traditional children's game. Along with tumbang preso, it is one of the most popular outdoor games played by children in the Philippines.

== Etymology ==
Patintero is derived from the Spanish word tinta ("tint" or "ink") in reference to the drawn lines. Another name for it is tubigan, tubiganay, or tubig-tubig ("water [game]"), due to the fact that the grid lines are also commonly drawn by wetting the ground with water. It is also known as harangang-taga or harang-taga (lit. "block and catch"), referring to the game mechanics.

Other names for the game include lumplumpas (Igorot), alagwa (Kapampangan), sinibon or serbab (Ilokano), and tadlas (for four players) or birus-birus (for six players) in eastern Visayas.

== Description ==
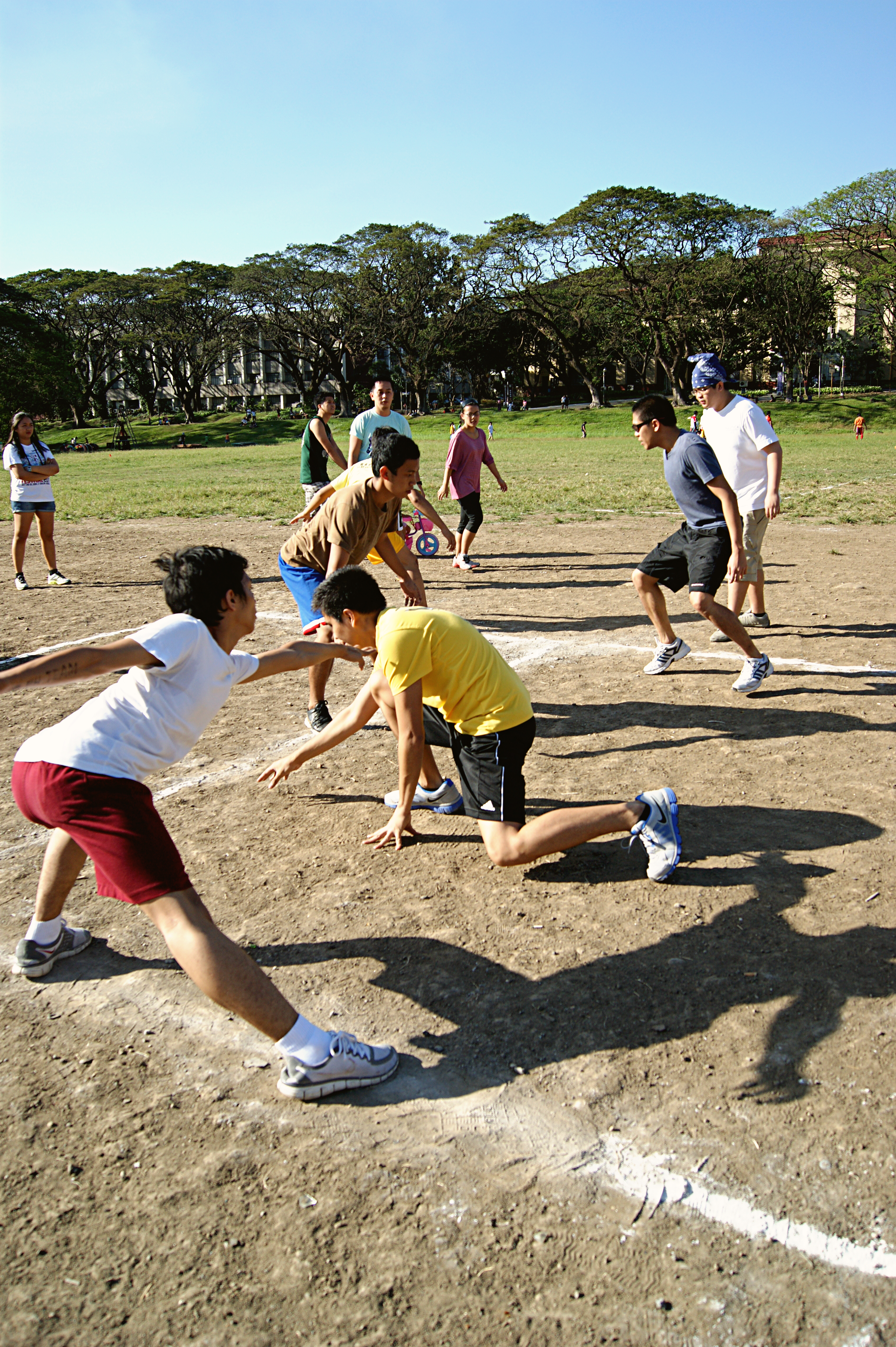
A tagger can only tag when their feet is contacting the line

Patintero is played on a rectangular grid drawn into the ground. The rectangle is usually 5 to 6 m (16 to 20 ft) in length, and 4 m (13 ft) wide. It is subdivided into four to six equal parts by drawing a central lengthwise line and then one or two crosswise lines. The size of the rectangle and the number of subdivisions can be adjusted based on the number of players. The individual squares in the grid must be large enough that someone can stay in the middle out of reach of someone standing on the lines.

Two teams are needed, each with around two to six players. One team acts as the taggers, the other acts as the runners. This is usually decided by a game of rock–paper–scissors (jak-en-poy) or a coin toss.

The objective of the game is to cross the rectangle back and forth without getting tagged. One tagger is usually assigned per crosswise line. Taggers can only move along their respective lines, with the exception of the tagger on the first line who is regarded as the team leader (patotot). Unlike the other taggers, the patotot can also move along the central lengthwise line. Taggers can tag runners at any time, including those already past them, but both of their feet must always be on the lines. Tagging a runner when none or only one foot is contacting the line is not counted.

Runners can cross at any time and to any adjacent square, however, they can only exit the playing rectangle at both ends of the rectangle. Once a runner is tagged, they are out and will sit out the match until the next game. Teams score points when they complete isang gabi ("one night"), a full circuit of the playing rectangle, from one end to the other and back again. Once all the runners have been tagged, the teams reverse roles, with the taggers now becoming the runners and vice versa.

In some versions of the game, the match ends if even only one runner is tagged. In others, this only applies if the patotot of the team is tagged. In modern versions, there is also sometimes a time limit for how long runners can attempt to score points. The match ends once the time is up, regardless if no points have been scored.

== In popular culture ==
Jaywalking is derisively referred to as "playing patintero with cars" in the Philippines.

== See also ==
- Traditional games in the Philippines
- Atya patya
- Squid game
- Galah panjang
