= Samahang Makasining =

Philippine art and cultural organization

Makasining
- Formation: 1982; 44 years ago
- Type: Service club
- Headquarters: Science City of Muñoz, Philippines
- Location: Philippines
- Official language: English, Filipino
- Website: www.makasining.org

Samahang Makasining (Artist Club) (also known as Makasining or Artist Club) is an art organization established in 1982, and the largest collegiate semi-fraternity in the Philippines. The organization aims to provide arts community service, art related youth development, and social development opportunities for college students in the Philippines. It is composed of young aspiring artists, national art professionals, environmentalists, students and out-of-school youth. The Indigenous games or Laro ng Lahi was coined and popularized by this group with the help of National Commission for Culture and the Arts (NCCA).

The only organization who uses a unique officer structure for their chapters. Grand Artist is the equivalent of the President, Auxiliary Grand artist as Committee chair or as Vice President, Master Artist as Junior Adviser and Grand Master Artist as Adviser. It is also broadly consists of three main recognized level groups; 1) College Student level group, 2) Alumni/Municipal/Professional Level and 3) Mixed Probationary level group.

== History ==
The club was established by a student organization in Central Luzon State University (CLSU), on February 12, 1982, and began with its first chapter at the Constancio Padilla National High School (CPNHS Young Artist Club) to be the first high school chapter founded on September 7, 1994. On September 5, 1995, the Nueva Ecija University of Science and Technology (NEUST Artist Club) in Cabanatuan City became the first College/University chapter. Founded also in that same year were the Ilocos Sur Polytechnic State College (ISPSC Artist Club) and Tarlac College of Agriculture (TCA Artist Club).

In 1998 the Samahang Makasining (Artist Club) was officially registered at the Securities and Exchange Commission (SEC) as a non-profit organization. The group has also been recognized and affiliated with the National Commission for Culture and the Arts (NCCA) in the same year (1998). After the SEC registration, the Pantabangan Municipal Chapter was founded and established on November 20, 1999, being the first Municipal/Professional level of the group.

The organization has extended and opened the horizon to all interested artists. The Philippine Rice Research Institute (PhilRice) Chapter became the first national agency professional-level members founded on November 7, 2003. On November 29, 2008, that was 11 years ago, the University of Southern Mindanao (USM Artist Club) was founded and became the first University chapter in the Mindanao area. There are now 42 chapters nationwide as of 2014.

=== The members ===
The members often use "brother" or "sister" for their members. The others called the members as Makasining (Filipino term for pro-artist) or sometimes the members within the club use the word Kasining (Filipino term co-artist).

== Ritual and symbolism ==
The candle is a symbolic object for the group. It is a symbol of a newborn artist for the organization, while the candle light symbolizes the artist's life, knowledge, and education. The Makasining describes itself as an "Art educator of the Universe, one of the great messengers".

== Contributions ==
- Reservation of the Laro ng Lahi (Indigenous Games)
- Advocating the use of Indigenous Materials for Art and craft
- Reinforcing Indigenism in the country
