= Duck on a rock =

Medieval children's game that combines tag and throwing objects to eliminate players

Duck on a rock is a children's game that combines tag and marksmanship (via throwing accuracy). James Naismith used the game as an inspiration when he developed the rules of modern basketball.

== Game play ==
"Duck on a rock" is played by placing a somewhat large stone (known as a "duck") upon a larger stone or a tree stump. One player stays near the stone to guard it. The other players throw stones at the "duck" in an attempt to knock it off of the platform.

Once the duck stone is knocked off, the throwers all rush to retrieve their stones while the guard replaces the stone and then attempts to tag them. If a player is tagged by the guard before returning to the throwing line with their stone, that player becomes the guard.

== Inspiration for basketball ==
In 2006, James Naismith's granddaughter discovered his handwritten notes and typewritten rules among boxes of documents in her basement. In the documents, Naismith recalled playing "duck on a rock" as a child and used its rules as inspiration when he developed the game of basketball in 1891. This led him to conceive of a game where a ball was thrown at a raised target. One of Naismith's players, Frank Mahan, suggested the name "basketball," which Naismith adopted.

== See also ==
- The dictionary definition of duck on a rock at Wiktionary
- Tumbang preso
