= Luksong baka =

Children's game in the Philippines

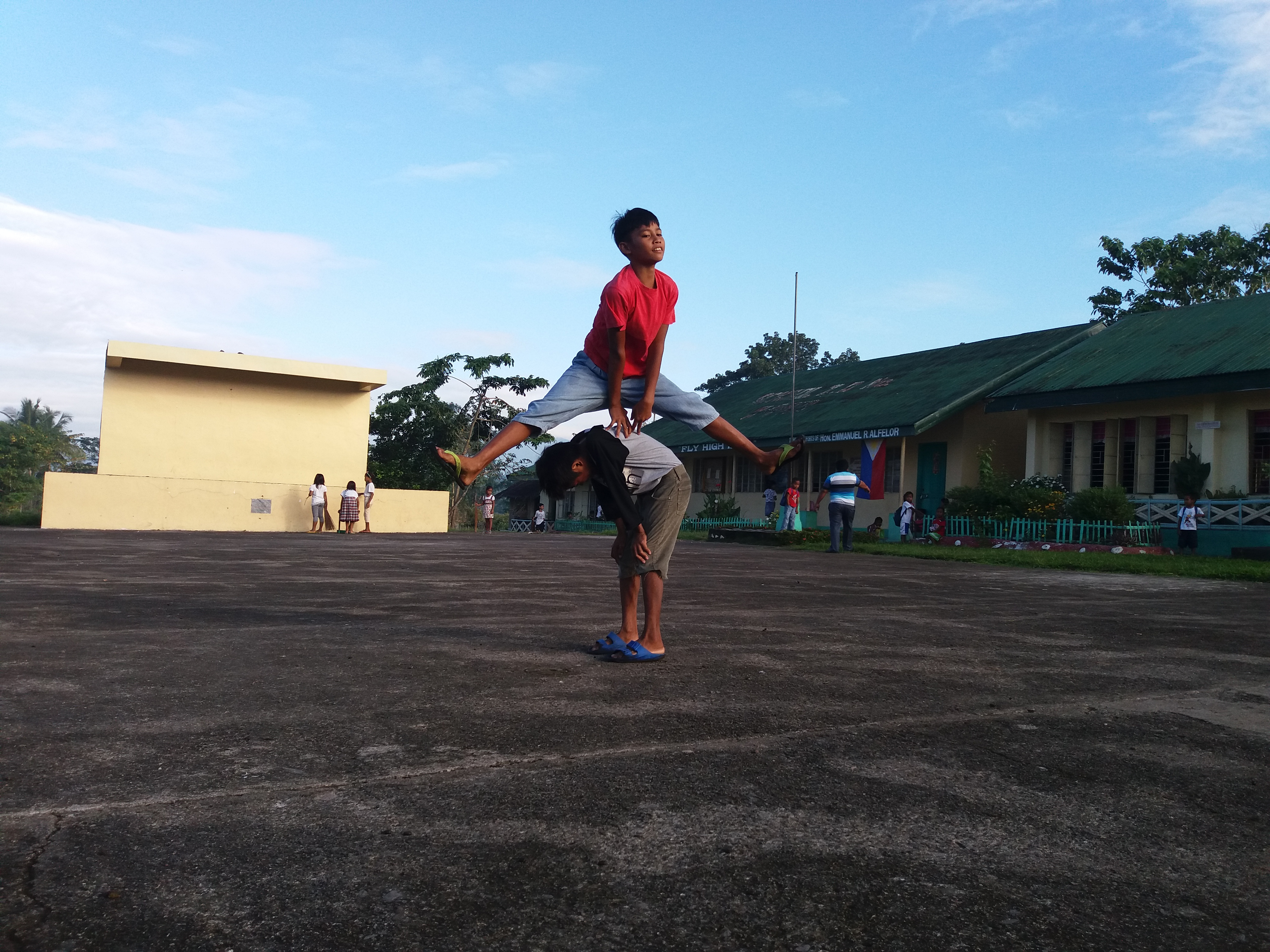
An example of children playing luksong baka

Luksong baka (English: Jump over the Cow, leapfrog) is a traditional Filipino game that originated in Bulacan. It involves a minimum of three players and a maximum of 10 players, and involves them jumping over the person called the baka, or "cow". The main goal of the players is to successfully jump over the baka without touching or falling over the baka.

== Rules ==
At the start of the game, one player is designated taya (it), or in this game the bakang lala (cow). The players should avoid touching or falling over the baka player while jumping over. The baka player should start with a kneeling-down position (a baka player bends over with their hands placed on his knees). All players are to jump over the baka until all the players have jumped. Once the first set of jumping over the baka is done, the baka player will slowly rise up after jumping over the baka player. Only the hands of the jumper may touch the back of the person who is bent over. If a player fails to avoid contact or fall over the baka, they will replace the baka player with a kneeling position (step 3), and the game continues until the all players decide to end the game.

=== Other notes ===
- Players should find a safe area to play the game (such as a grassy area) so whenever a player falls, the landing will not cause as many injuries.
- Players should also be fit enough to play in order to jump high, but not that would cause injuries.
- Also, players are recommended to be energetic, especially after a long succession of jumps over the baka player.
- Players must be cooperative with others and have self-confidence.
- It is recommended that players ask the baka or taya to put their head down in avoiding the players' foot hitting the baka's head.
