= Palosebo =

Traditional game in the Philippines

Palo-sebo (from the Spanish "pole-grease") is a traditional Filipino game. A local variant of the greasy pole, it is likely derived from the Spanish cucaña.

== Description ==
This game is usually played by boys during a town fiesta or on special occasions in the various provinces of the Philippines. Long and straight bamboo poles are polished and greased, after which a small bag containing the prize is tied to the top. The bag usually contains money, sweets, or toys. Sometimes a small flag is used instead of the actual prize, which is given to the winner afterwards.

=== Play ===
Contestants try to climb the pole in turns to secure the prize, and anyone who fails to reach the top is disqualified. The winner is the one who succeeds in reaching and untying the prize or retrieving the flag.

== See also ==
- Traditional Filipino games
