= James Naismith =

Inventor of basketball (1861–1939)

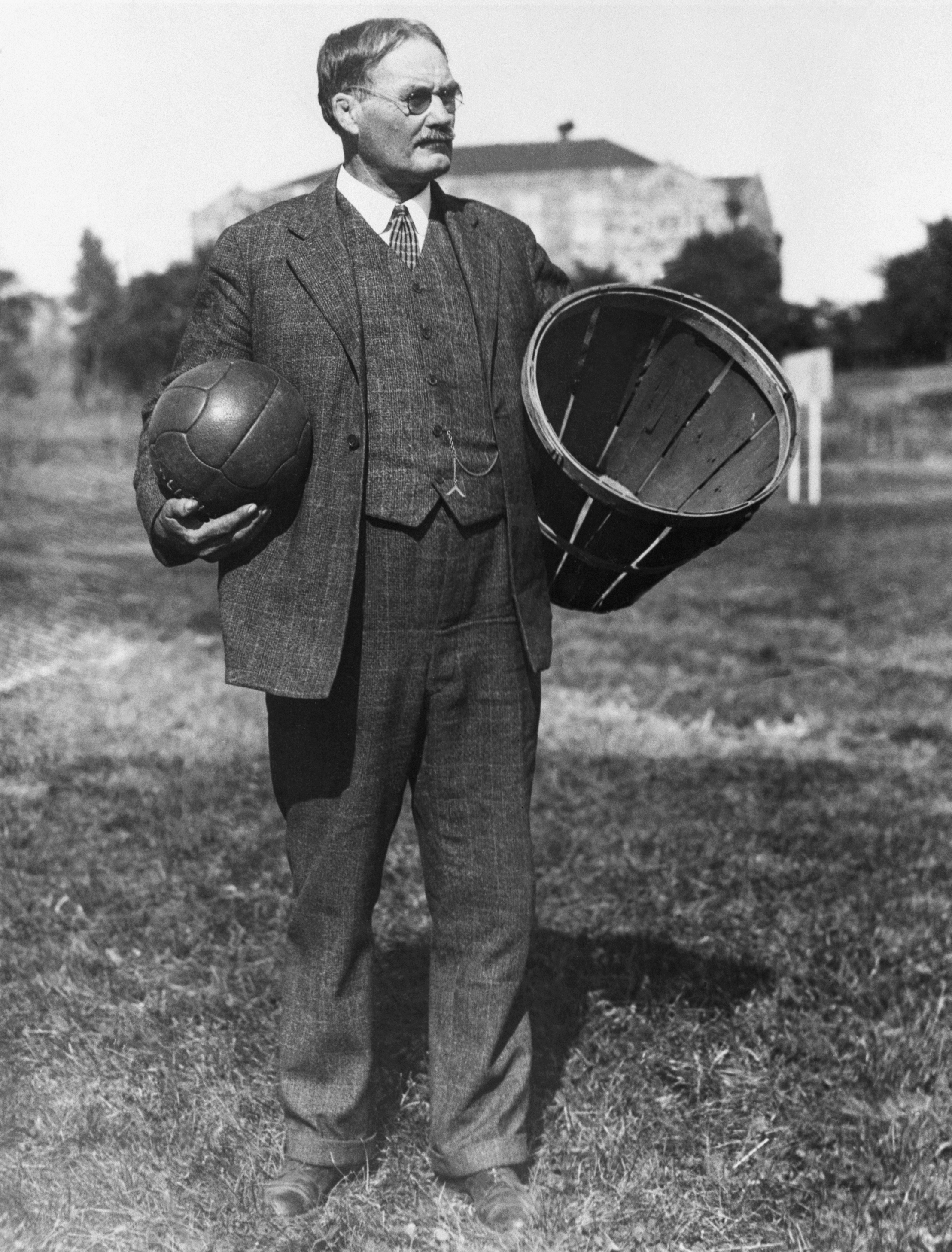
- Naismith holding a basketball and basket

Biographical details
- Born: November 6, 1861; Almonte, Canada West, Province of Canada, British North America
- Died: November 28, 1939 (aged 78); Lawrence, Kansas, United States
- Education: McGill University; Springfield College; Presbyterian College

Coaching career (HC unless noted)

Basketball
- 1898–1907: Kansas

Track and field
- 1900–1906: Kansas

Head coaching record
- Overall: 55–60 (basketball)

Accomplishments and honors

Awards
- FIBA Hall of Fame; Canadian Basketball Hall of Fame; Canadian Olympic Hall of Fame; Canadian Sports Hall of Fame; Ontario Sports Hall of Fame; Ottawa Sport Hall of Fame; McGill University Sports Hall of Fame; Oklahoma State Sports Hall of Fame
- Basketball Hall of Fame; Inducted in 1959 (profile)
- College Basketball Hall of Fame; Inducted in 2006

James Naismith (/ˈneɪsmɪθ/ NAY-smith; November 6, 1861 – November 28, 1939) was a Canadian-American physical educator, physician, Christian chaplain, and sports coach, best known as the inventor of the game of basketball. First developing the game in Canada, he wrote the original basketball rule book after moving to the United States and founded the University of Kansas basketball program in 1898.

Naismith studied and taught physical education at McGill University in Montreal until 1890, before moving later that year to Springfield, Massachusetts, where in 1891 he designed basketball while teaching at the International YMCA Training School. Seven years after inventing basketball, Naismith received his medical degree in Denver in 1898. He then arrived at the University of Kansas, later becoming the Kansas Jayhawks' athletic director and coach. While a coach at Kansas, Naismith coached Phog Allen, who later became the coach at Kansas for 39 seasons, beginning a lengthy coaching tree. Allen went on to coach players including Adolph Rupp and Dean Smith, who themselves coached many notable players and future coaches.

Naismith lived to see basketball adopted as an Olympic demonstration sport in 1904 and as an official event at the 1936 Summer Olympics in Berlin, and to see the birth of the National Invitation Tournament (1938) and the NCAA Tournament (1939). He also lived to see the creation of half of the leagues that eventually became the present-day National Basketball Association, with the 1935 creation of the Midwest Basketball Conference before it became the National Basketball League in 1937.

== Early years ==
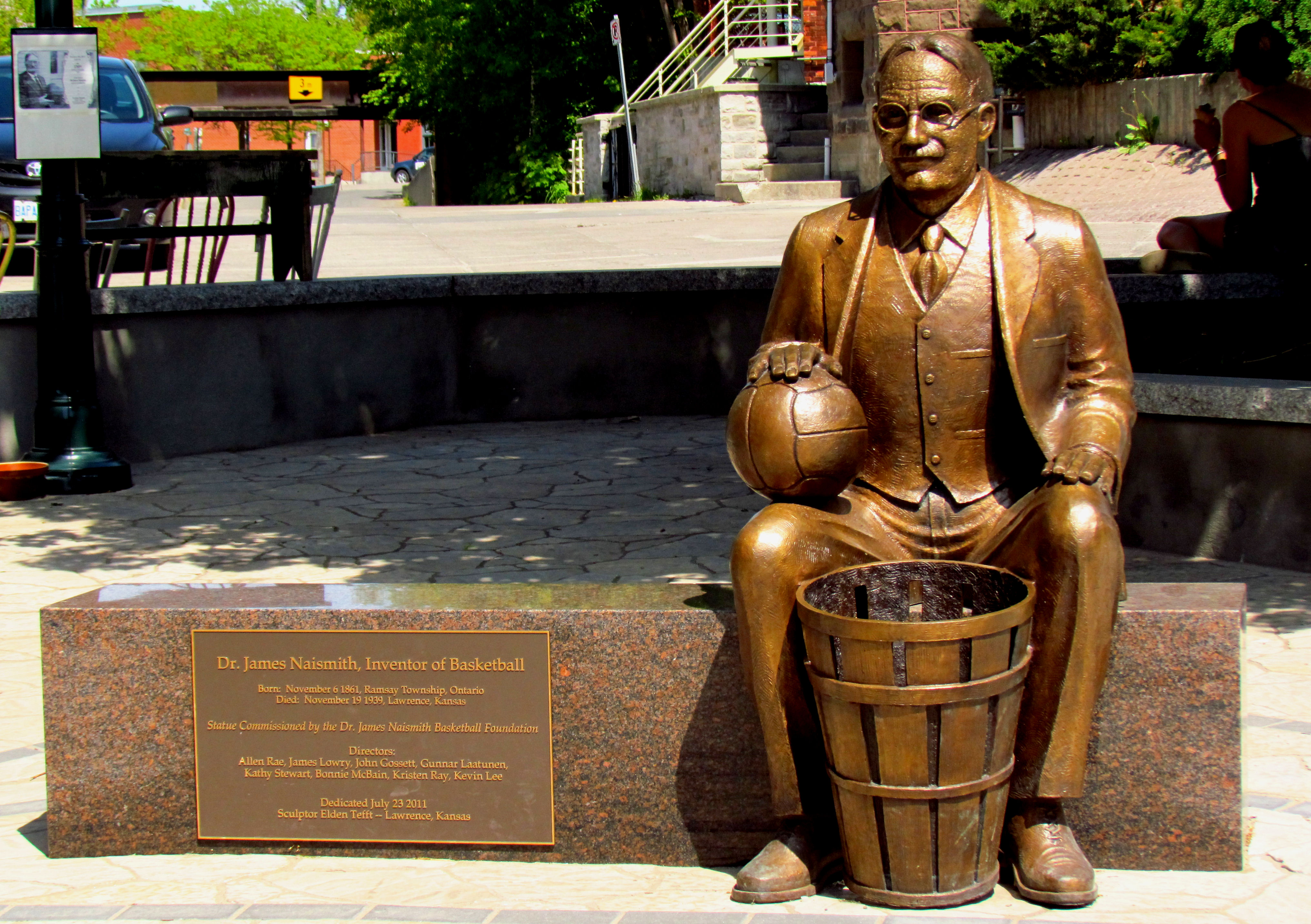
Sculpture in Almonte, Ontario. Identical copies are located in Springfield, Massachusetts, and Lawrence, Kansas.

Naismith was born on November 6, 1861, in Almonte, Canada West, Province of Canada (now part of Mississippi Mills, Ontario, Canada) to Scottish parents. Despite some sources to the contrary, Naismith never had a middle name and never signed his name with an "A" initial. The "A" was added by someone in administration at the University of Kansas. (Note: In 1982, Naismith's only living child stated that his father never had the middle initial "A". According to Canadian basketball historian Curtis J. Phillips, other members of Naismith's family and friends also confirm this.) Naismith spent his days outside playing catch, hide-and-seek, or duck on a rock, a medieval game in which a person guards a large skipping stone from opposing players, who try to knock it down by throwing smaller stones at it. Orphaned early in his life, Naismith lived with his aunt and uncle for many years and attended grade school at Bennies Corners near Almonte. Then, he enrolled in Almonte High School, in Almonte, Ontario, from which he graduated in 1883.

In the same year, Naismith entered McGill University in Montreal. Although described as a slight figure, standing 5 feet 10 1/2 inches (1.791 m) and listed at 178 pounds (81 kg) he was a talented and versatile athlete, representing McGill in football, lacrosse, rugby, soccer, and gymnastics. He played centre on the football team, and made himself some padding to protect his ears. He won multiple Wicksteed medals for outstanding gymnastics performances. Naismith earned a BA in physical education (1888) and a diploma at the Presbyterian College in Montreal (1890). At the end of his career, in 1938 and 1939, he would receive honorary doctorates from both institutions. From 1888 to 1890, Naismith taught physical education and became the first McGill director of athletics, but then left Montreal to study at the YMCA International Training School in Springfield, Massachusetts. Naismith played football during his one year as a student at Springfield, where he was coached by Amos Alonzo Stagg and scored a touchdown in the first exhibition of indoor college football at Madison Square Garden.

== Springfield College: Invention of basketball ==
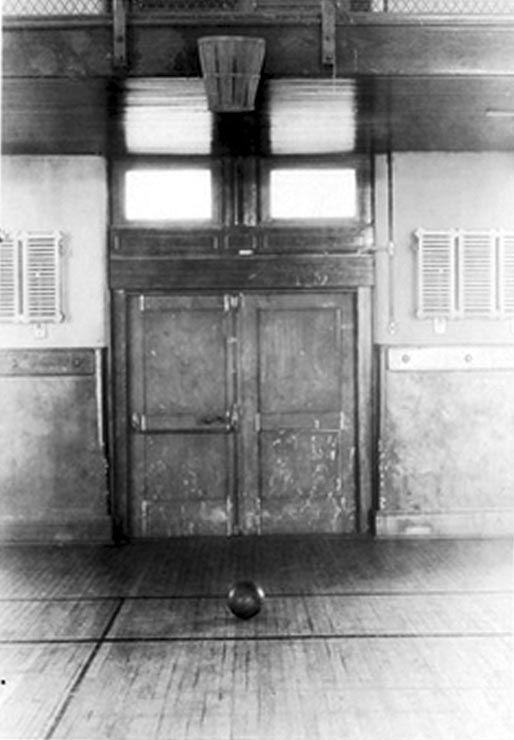
The original 1891 "Basket Ball" court in Springfield College. It used a peach basket attached to the wall.

Naismith is credited with inventing basketball. Having been an outstanding football player at McGill University in Montreal, he later decided to become a physical education teacher at McGill University for his three postgraduate years and then went to Springfield, Massachusetts, to study at the YMCA International Training School in the 1890s. Whilst teaching there, Naismith realized he needed to invent an indoor game for the winter due to the weather conditions.

After completing the YMCA physical director training program that had brought him to Springfield, Naismith was hired as a full-time faculty member in 1891. At the Springfield YMCA, Naismith struggled with a rowdy class that was confined to indoor games throughout the harsh New England winter, and thus was perpetually short-tempered. Under orders from then head of physical education Luther Gulick, Naismith was given 14 days to create an indoor game that would provide an "athletic distraction"; Gulick demanded that it would not take up much room, could help its track athletes to keep in shape and explicitly emphasized to "make it fair for all players and not too rough". Naismith was later employed to teach physical education using two boxes. He told the superintendent he needed the two boxes to be put onto a pole so a large ball could be thrown into them.

In his attempt to think up a new game, Naismith was guided by three main thoughts. Firstly, he analyzed the most popular games of the times (rugby, lacrosse, soccer, football, hockey, and baseball); Naismith noticed the hazards of a ball and concluded that the big, soft soccer ball was safest. He noticed that most physical injuries would occur with players being in direct contact. Due to this discovery players were not permitted to run with the ball. Instead, they had to throw it from the spot where they caught it. In addition the ball was to be held only with the hands, the arms and body could not be used to cradle and carry the ball. Finally, to further reduce physical contact Naismith decided to make the goal open to all players by placing it high above the player's heads with the plane of the goal's opening parallel to the floor. This made the goal unguardable, giving players an equal opportunity to score. In order to score goals, players would throw a soft, lobbing shot like that which had proven effective in his old favorite game, duck on a rock. For this purpose, Naismith asked a janitor to find a pair of boxes, but the janitor brought him peach baskets instead. Naismith christened this new game Basket Ball and put his thoughts together in 13 basic rules.

The first game of "Basket Ball" was played in December 1891. In a handwritten report, Naismith described the circumstances of the inaugural match; in contrast to modern basketball, the players played nine versus nine, handled a soccer ball, and instead of shooting at two hoops, the goals were a pair of peach baskets: "When Mr. Stubbins brot [sic] up the peach baskets to the gym I secured them on the inside of the railing of the gallery. This was about 10 feet [3.0 meters] from the floor, one at each end of the gymnasium. I then put the 13 rules on the bulletin board just behind the instructor's platform, secured a soccer ball, and awaited the arrival of the class ... The class did not show much enthusiasm, but followed my lead ... I then explained what they had to do to make goals, tossed the ball up between the two center men and tried to keep them somewhat near the rules. Most of the fouls were called for running with the ball, though tackling the man with the ball was not uncommon." In contrast to modern basketball, the original rules did not include what is known today as the dribble. Since the ball could only be moved up the court by a pass early players tossed the ball over their heads as they ran up court. Also following each "goal", a jump ball was taken in the middle of the court. Both practices are obsolete in the rules of modern basketball.

In a radio interview in January 1939, Naismith gave more details of the first game and the initial rules that were used:

I showed them two peach baskets I'd nailed up at each end of the gym, and I told them the idea was to throw the ball into the opposing team's peach basket. I blew a whistle, and the first game of basketball began ... The boys began tackling, kicking, and punching in the clinches. They ended up in a free-for-all in the middle of the gym floor. [The injury toll: several black eyes, one separated shoulder, and one player knocked unconscious.] It certainly was murder. [Naismith changed some of the rules as part of his quest to develop a clean sport.] The most important one was that there should be no running with the ball. That stopped tackling and slugging. We tried out the game with those [new] rules (fouls), and we didn't have one casualty.

Naismith was a classmate of Amos Alonzo Stagg at the YMCA School, where Stagg coached the football team. They became close friends and Naismith played on the football team and Stagg played on the basketball team. Naismith invited Stagg to play in the first public basketball game on March 12, 1892. The students defeated the faculty 5–1 and Stagg scored the only basket for the faculty. The Springfield Republican reported on the same: "Over 200 spectators crammed their necks over the gallery railing of the Christian Workers gymnasium while they watched the game of 'basket ball' between the teachers and the students. The most conspicuous figure on the floor was Stagg in the blue Yale uniform who managed to have a hand in every scrimmage."

By 1892, basketball had grown so popular on campus that Dennis Horkenbach (editor-in-chief of The Triangle, the Springfield college newspaper) featured it in an article called "A New Game", and there were calls to call this new game "Naismith Ball", but Naismith refused. By 1893, basketball was introduced internationally by the YMCA movement. From Springfield, Naismith went to Denver, where he acquired a medical degree, and in 1898, he joined the University of Kansas faculty at Lawrence.

The family of Lambert G. Will, disputing Naismith's sole creation of the game, has claimed that Naismith borrowed components for the game of basketball from Will, citing alleged photos and letters. In an interview, the family did give Naismith credit for the general idea of the sport, but they claimed Will changed aspects of Naismith's original plans for the game and Naismith took credit for the changes.

Spalding worked with Naismith to develop the official basketball and the Spalding Athletic Library official basketball rule book for 1893–1894.

== University of Kansas ==
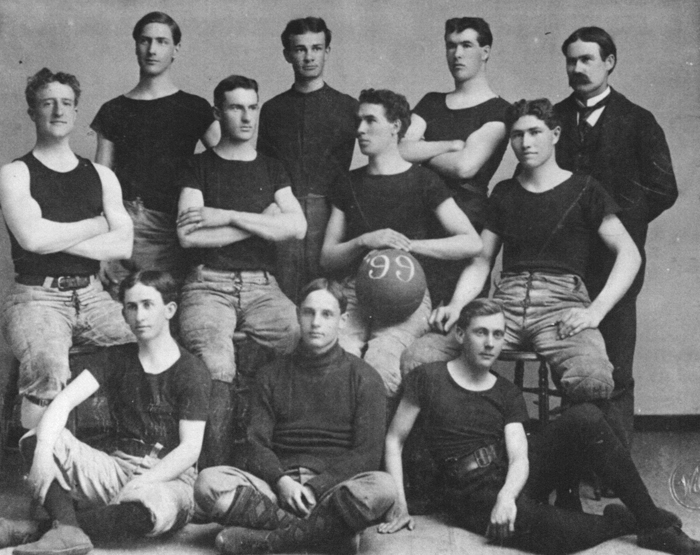
1899 University of Kansas basketball team, with James Naismith at the back, right

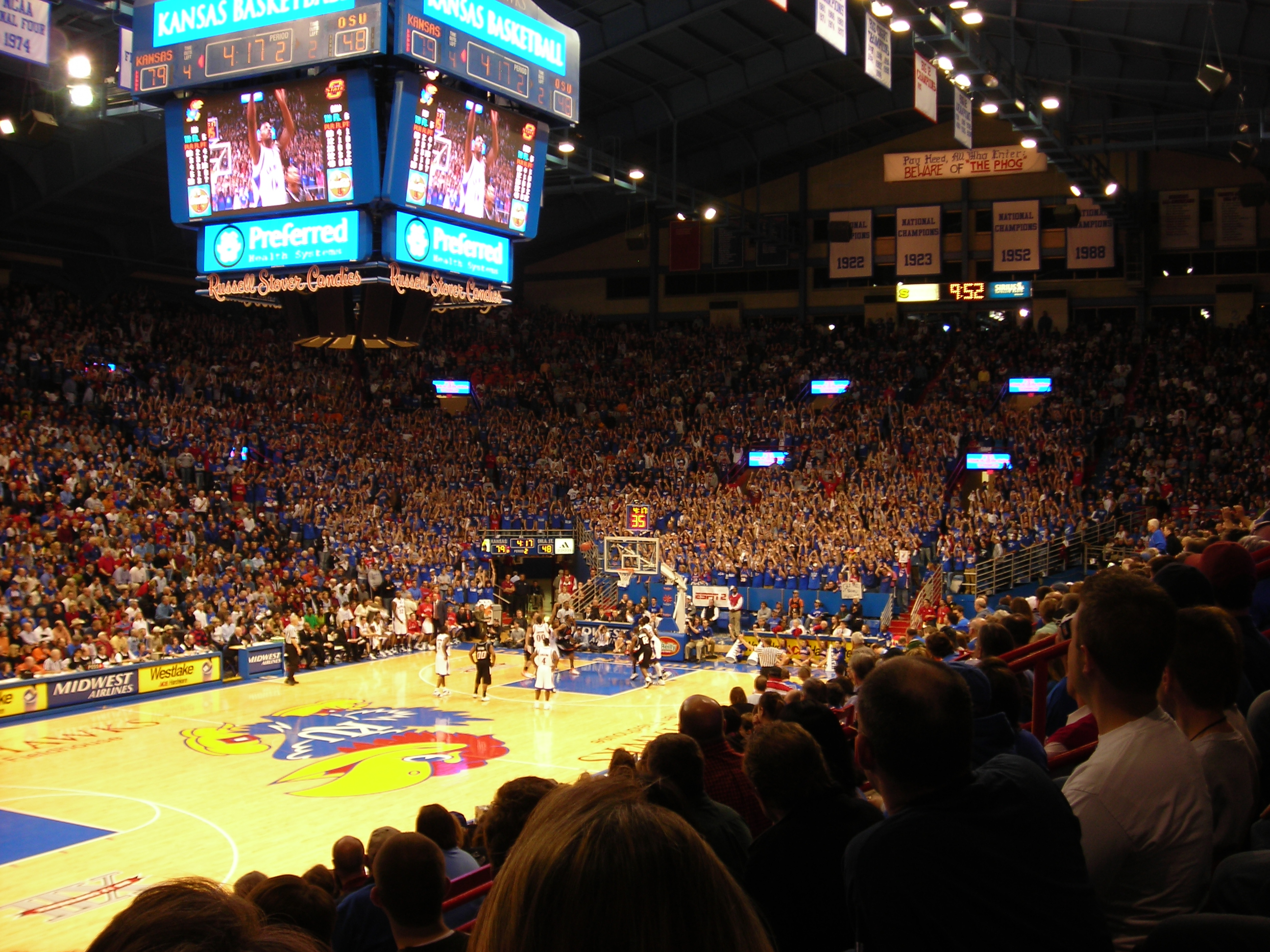
Basketball games at Allen Fieldhouse take place on the James Naismith Court.

The University of Kansas men's basketball program officially began following Naismith's arrival in 1898, seven years after Naismith drafted the sport's first official rules. Naismith was not initially hired to coach basketball, but rather as a chapel director and physical-education instructor. In those early days, the majority of the basketball games were played against nearby YMCA teams, with YMCAs across the nation having played an integral part in the birth of basketball. Other common opponents were Haskell Indian Nations University and William Jewell College. Under Naismith, the team played only one current Big 12 school: Kansas State (once). Naismith is the only coach in the program's history to have a losing record (55–60). However, Naismith coached Forrest "Phog" Allen, his eventual successor at Kansas, who went on to join his mentor in the Naismith Memorial Basketball Hall of Fame.

When Allen became a coach himself and told him that he was going to coach basketball at Baker University in 1904, Naismith discouraged him: "You can't coach basketball; you just play it." Instead, Allen embarked on a coaching career that would lead him to be known as "the Father of Basketball Coaching". During his time at Kansas, Allen coached Dean Smith (1952 National Championship team) and Adolph Rupp (1922 Helms Foundation National Championship team). Smith and Rupp have joined Naismith and Allen as members of the Basketball Hall of Fame.

By the turn of the century, enough college teams were in the East that the first intercollegiate competitions could be played out. Although the sport continued to grow, Naismith long regarded the game as a curiosity and preferred gymnastics and wrestling as better forms of physical activity. However, basketball became a demonstration sport at the 1904 Summer Olympics in St. Louis. As the Naismith Memorial Basketball Hall of Fame reports, Naismith was not interested in self-promotion nor was he interested in the glory of competitive sports. Instead, he was more interested in his physical-education career; he received an honorary PE master's degree in 1910, patrolled the Mexican border for four months in 1916, traveled to France, and published two books (A Modern College in 1911 and Essence of a Healthy Life in 1918). He took American citizenship on May 4, 1925. In 1909, Naismith's duties at Kansas were redefined as a professorship; he served as the de facto athletic director at Kansas for much of the early 20th century.

Naismith had "strong feelings against segregation," dating back to his World War I-era service in France and his service on the United States-Mexico border, and he strove for progress in race relations through modest steps. During the 1930s, he would not or could not get African Americans onto Kansas' varsity Jayhawks, but he did help engineer the admission of black students to the university's swimming pool. Until then, they had been given automatic passing grades on a required swimming test without entering the pool, so it could remain all-white.

Through Naismith's association with Baker University Basketball Coach Emil Liston, he became familiar and impressed with Emil Liston's fraternity at Baker University, Sigma Phi Epsilon (SigEp). As a result, he started the effort to bring a Sigma Phi Epsilon chapter to his University of Kansas (KU). On February 18, 1923, Naismith, intending to bring a SigEp Chapter to KU, was initiated as a SigEp member by national office of the fraternity. Under Naismith's leadership, the University of Kansas Sigma Phi Epsilon chapter was founded and officially Charted on April 28, 1923, with Naismith leading the new 40-member fraternity as "Chapter Counselor". Naismith was deeply involved with the members, serving as Chapter Counselor for 16 years, from 1923 until his death in 1939. During those 16 years as Chapter Counselor, he married SigEp's housemother, Mrs. Florence Kincaid. Members who were interviewed during that era remembered Naismith: "He was deeply religious", "He listened more than he spoke", "He thought sports were nothing but an avenue to keep young people involved so they could do their studies and relate to their community", and "It was really nice having someone with the caliber of Dr. Naismith, he helped many a SigEp."

In 1935, the National Association of Basketball Coaches (founded by Naismith's pupil Phog Allen) collected money so the 74-year-old Naismith could witness the introduction of basketball into the official Olympic sports program of the 1936 Summer Olympic Games in Berlin. There, Naismith handed out the medals to three North American teams: the United States, for the gold medal, Canada, for the silver medal, and Mexico, for their bronze medal. During the Olympics, he was named the honorary president of the International Basketball Federation. When Naismith returned, he commented that seeing the game played by many nations was the greatest compensation he could have received for his invention. In 1937, Naismith played a role in the formation of the National Association of Intercollegiate Basketball, which later became the National Association of Intercollegiate Athletics (NAIA).

Naismith became professor emeritus at Kansas when he retired in 1937 at the age of 76. In addition to his years as a coach, for a total of almost 40 years, Naismith worked at the school and during those years, he also served as its athletic director and was also a faculty member at the school. In 1939, Naismith suffered a fatal brain hemorrhage. He was interred at Memorial Park Cemetery in Lawrence, Kansas. His masterwork "Basketball — its Origins and Development" was published posthumously in 1941. Also in 1941, the National Academy of Kinesiology (née American Academy of Physical Education) recognized Naismith (posthumously) for creating the game of basketball by granting him their "Creative Award".

In Lawrence, Naismith has a road named in his honor, Naismith Drive, which runs in front of Allen Fieldhouse. James Naismith Court in Allen Fieldhouse is named in his honor as well. Naismith Valley Park and the dormitory Naismith Hall are also named after him.

== Head-coaching record ==
=== Basketball ===
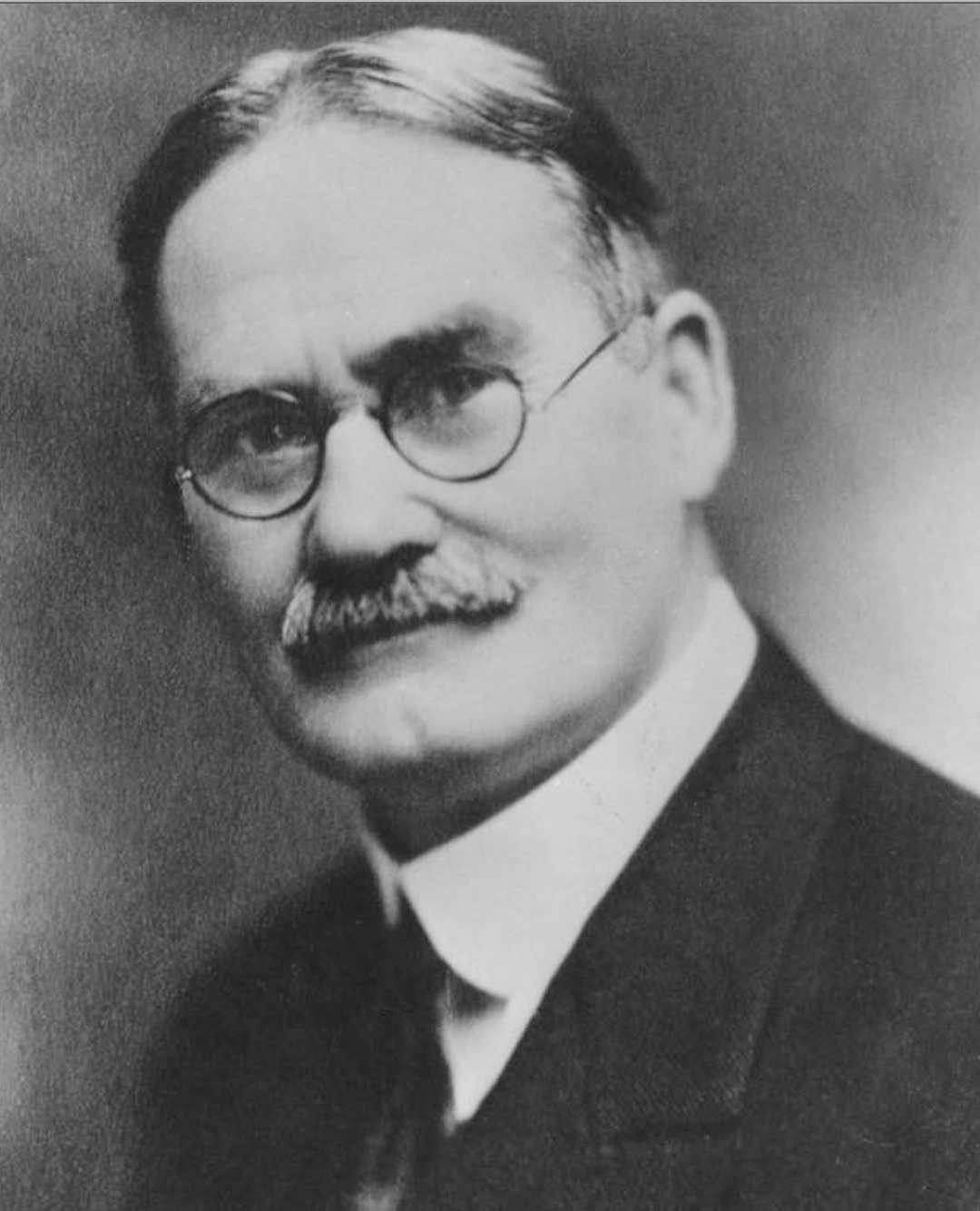
Naismith as University of Kansas athletics director, c. 1920

In 1898, Naismith became the first basketball coach of University of Kansas. He compiled a record of 55–60 and is the only losing coach in Kansas history. Naismith is at the beginning of a massive and prestigious coaching tree, as he coached Naismith Memorial Basketball Hall of Fame coach Phog Allen, who himself coached Hall of Fame coaches Dean Smith, Adolph Rupp, and Ralph Miller who all coached future coaches as well.

In addition to Allen, Naismith also can be seen as a mentor and therefore beginning for the coaching tree branches of John McLendon who wasn't permitted to play at Kansas but was close to Naismith during his time as an athletic director. Amos Alonzo Stagg, was primarily a football coach, but he did play basketball for Naismith in Springfield, coached a year of basketball at Chicago and had several football players who also coached basketball such as Jesse Harper, Fred Walker and Tony Hinkle.

Record table
Season	Team	Overall	Conference	Standing	Postseason
Kansas Jayhawks (Independent) (1898–1907)
1898–99	Kansas	7–4			
1899–00	Kansas	3–4			
1900–01	Kansas	4–8			
1901–02	Kansas	5–7			
1902–03	Kansas	7–8			
1903–04	Kansas	5–8			
1904–05	Kansas	5–6			
1905–06	Kansas	12–7			
1906–07	Kansas	7–8			
Total:		55–60 (.478)			

== Legacy ==
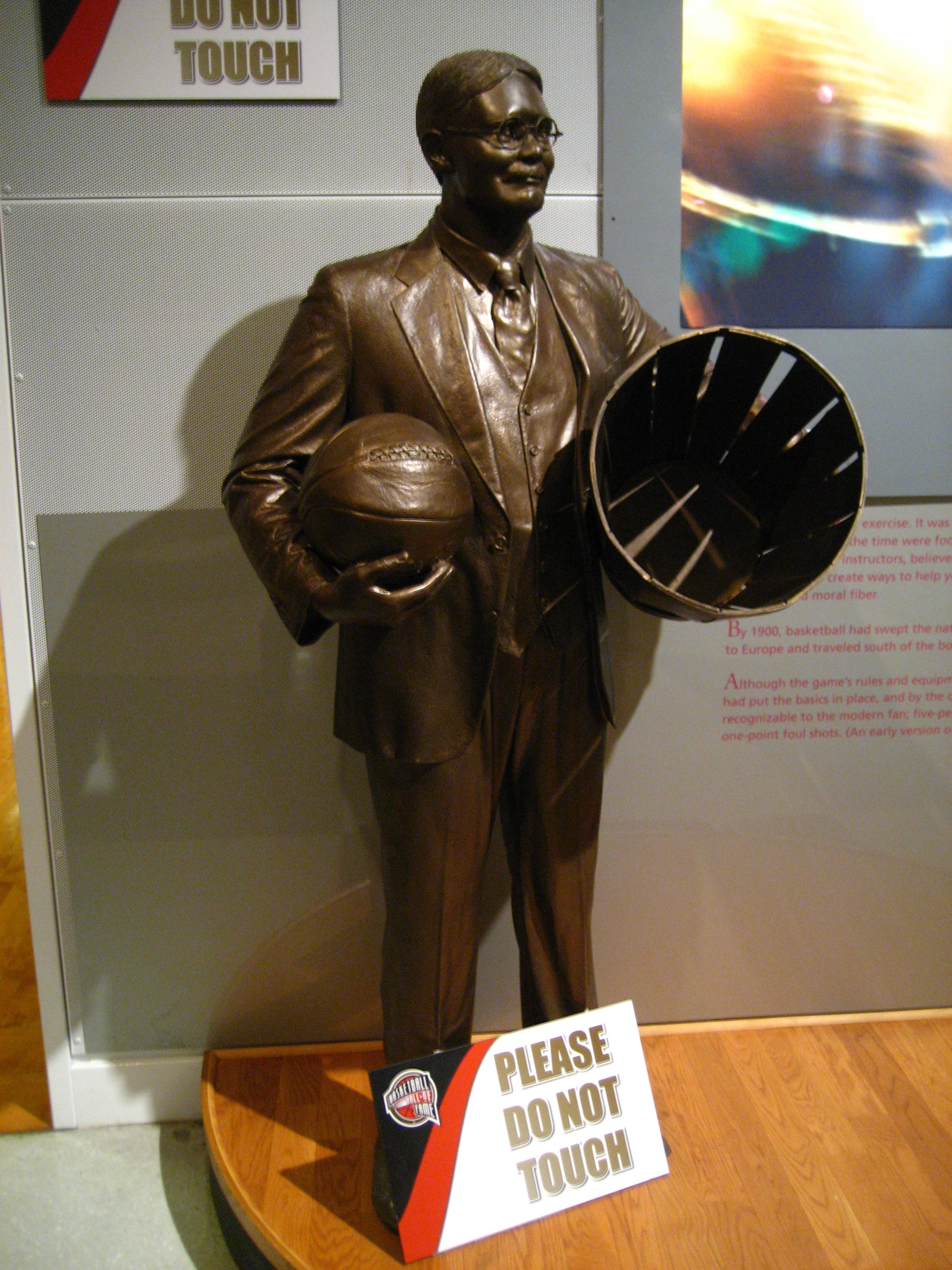
Statue of James Naismith at Basketball Hall of Fame and Museum in Springfield, Massachusetts

Naismith invented the game of basketball and wrote the original 13 rules of this sport; for comparison, the NBA rule book today features 66 pages. The Naismith Memorial Basketball Hall of Fame in Springfield, Massachusetts, is named in his honor, and he was an inaugural inductee in 1959. The National Collegiate Athletic Association rewards its best players and coaches annually with the Naismith Awards, among them the Naismith College Player of the Year, the Naismith College Coach of the Year, and the Naismith Prep Player of the Year. After the Olympic introduction to men's basketball in 1936, women's basketball became an Olympic event in Montreal during the 1976 Summer Olympics.

Naismith was also inducted into the Canadian Basketball Hall of Fame, the Canadian Olympic Hall of Fame, the Canadian Sports Hall of Fame, the Ontario Sports Hall of Fame, the Ottawa Sport Hall of Fame, the McGill University Sports Hall of Fame, the Kansas State Sports Hall of Fame, FIBA Hall of Fame. The FIBA Basketball World Cup trophy is named the "James Naismith Trophy" in his honor. On June 21, 2013, Naismith was inducted into the Kansas Hall of Fame during ceremonies in Topeka.

Naismith's home town of Almonte, Ontario, hosts an annual 3-on-3 tournament for all ages and skill levels in his honor. Every year, this event attracts hundreds of participants and involves over 20 half-court games along the main street of the town.

Today basketball is played by more than 300 million people worldwide, making it one of the most popular team sports. In North America, basketball has produced some of the most-admired athletes of the 20th century. ESPN and the Associated Press both conducted polls to name the greatest North American athlete of the 20th century. Basketball player Michael Jordan came in first in the ESPN poll and second (behind Babe Ruth) in the AP poll. Both polls featured fellow basketball players Wilt Chamberlain (of KU, like Naismith) and Bill Russell in the top 20.

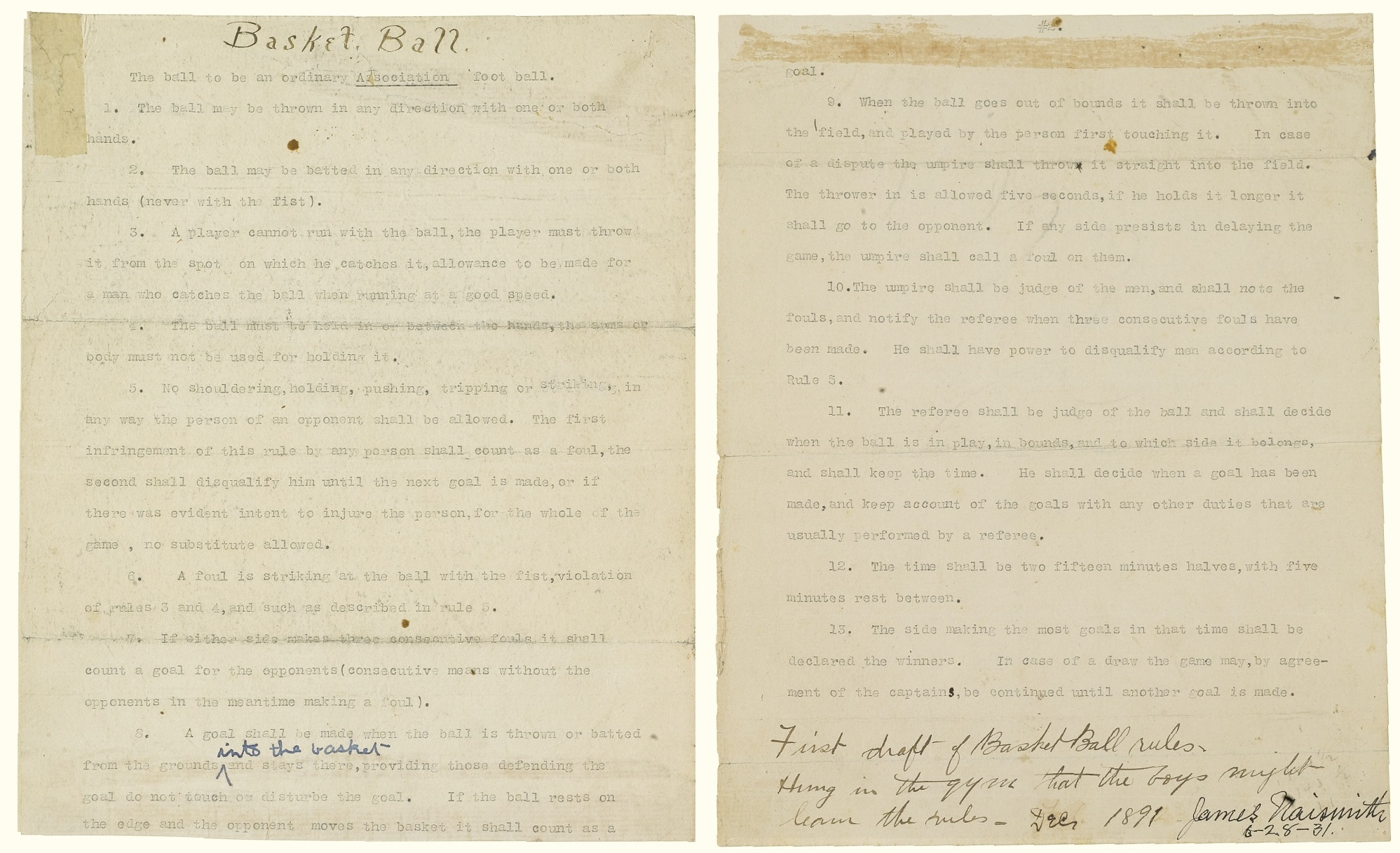
Typewritten first draft of the rules of basketball by Naismith

The original rules of basketball written by Naismith in 1891, considered to be basketball's founding document, were auctioned at Sotheby's, New York, in December 2010. Josh Swade, a University of Kansas alumnus and basketball enthusiast, went on a crusade in 2010 to persuade moneyed alumni to consider bidding on and hopefully winning the document at auction to give it to the University of Kansas. Swade eventually persuaded David G. Booth, a billionaire investment banker and KU alumnus, and his wife Suzanne Booth, to commit to bidding at the auction. The Booths won the bidding and purchased the document for a record US$4,338,500, the most ever paid for a sports memorabilia item, and gave the document to the University of Kansas. Swade's project and eventual success are chronicled in a 2012 ESPN 30 for 30 documentary "There's No Place Like Home" and in a corresponding book, The Holy Grail of Hoops: One Fan's Quest to Buy the Original Rules of Basketball. The University of Kansas constructed an $18 million building named the Debruce Center, which houses the rules and opened in March 2016.

Naismith was designated a National Historic Person in 1976, on the advice of the national Historic Sites and Monuments Board

In 1991, postage stamps commemorated the centennial of basketball's invention: four stamps were issued by Canada Post, including one with Naismith's name; one stamp was issued by the US Postal Service. Another Canadian stamp, in 2009, honored the game's invention.

In July 2019, Naismith was inducted into Toronto's Walk of Fame.

On January 15, 2021, Google placed a Google Doodle celebrating James Naismith on its home page in 18 countries, on five continents.

== Personal life ==
Naismith was the second child of two Scottish immigrants. His father left Europe when he was 18, and also settled down in Lanark County.

On June 20, 1894, Naismith married Maude Sherman in Springfield, Massachusetts. The couple had five children.

He was a member of the Pi Gamma Mu and Sigma Phi Epsilon fraternities. Naismith was a Presbyterian minister and was also a Freemason.

His first wife died in 1937, and on June 11, 1939, he married Florence Kincaid. On November 19 of that year, Naismith suffered a major brain hemorrhage and died nine days later in his home in Lawrence, Kansas. He was 78 years old. Naismith died eight months after the birth of the NCAA Basketball Championship, which today has evolved to one of the biggest sports events in North America. Naismith is buried with his first wife in Memorial Park Cemetery in Lawrence, Kansas. Florence Kincaid died in 1977 at the age of 98 and is buried with her first husband, Frank B. Kincaid, in Elmwood Cemetery in Beloit, Kansas.

During his lifetime, Naismith held these educational and academic positions:

Location	Position	Period	Remarks
Bennie's Corner Grade School (Almonte, Ontario)	Primary school	1867–1875	
Almonte High School	Secondary school	1875–1877, 1881–83	Dropped out and re-entered
McGill University	University student	1883–87	Bachelor of Arts in Physical Education
McGill University	Instructor in Physical Education	1887–1890	Gold Wickstead Medal (1887), Best All-Around Athlete; Silver Cup (1886), first prize for a one-mile walk; Silver Wickstead Medal (1885), Best All-Around Athlete; Awarded one of McGill's first varsity letters
The Presbyterian College, Montreal	Education in Theology	1887–1890	Silver medal (1890), second highest award for regular and special honor work in Theology
Springfield College	Instructor in Physical Education	1891–1895	Invented "Basket Ball" in December 1891
YMCA of Denver	Instructor in Physical Education	1895–1898	
University of Kansas	Instructor in Physical Education and Chapel Director	1898–1909	
University of Kansas	Basketball Coach	1898–1907	First-ever basketball coach
University of Kansas	Professor and University Physician	1909–1917	Hiatus from 1914 on due to World War I
First Kansas Infantry	Chaplain/Captain	1914–1917	Military service due to World War I
First Kansas Infantry (Mexican Border)	Chaplain	1916	
Military and YMCA secretary in France	Lecturer of Moral Conditions and Sex Education	1917–1919	
University of Kansas	Athletic Director	1919–1937	Emeritus in 1937

== See also ==
- James Naismith's Original Rules of Basketball
- Basketball scorekeeping
