= Tumbang preso =

Children's game in the Philippines

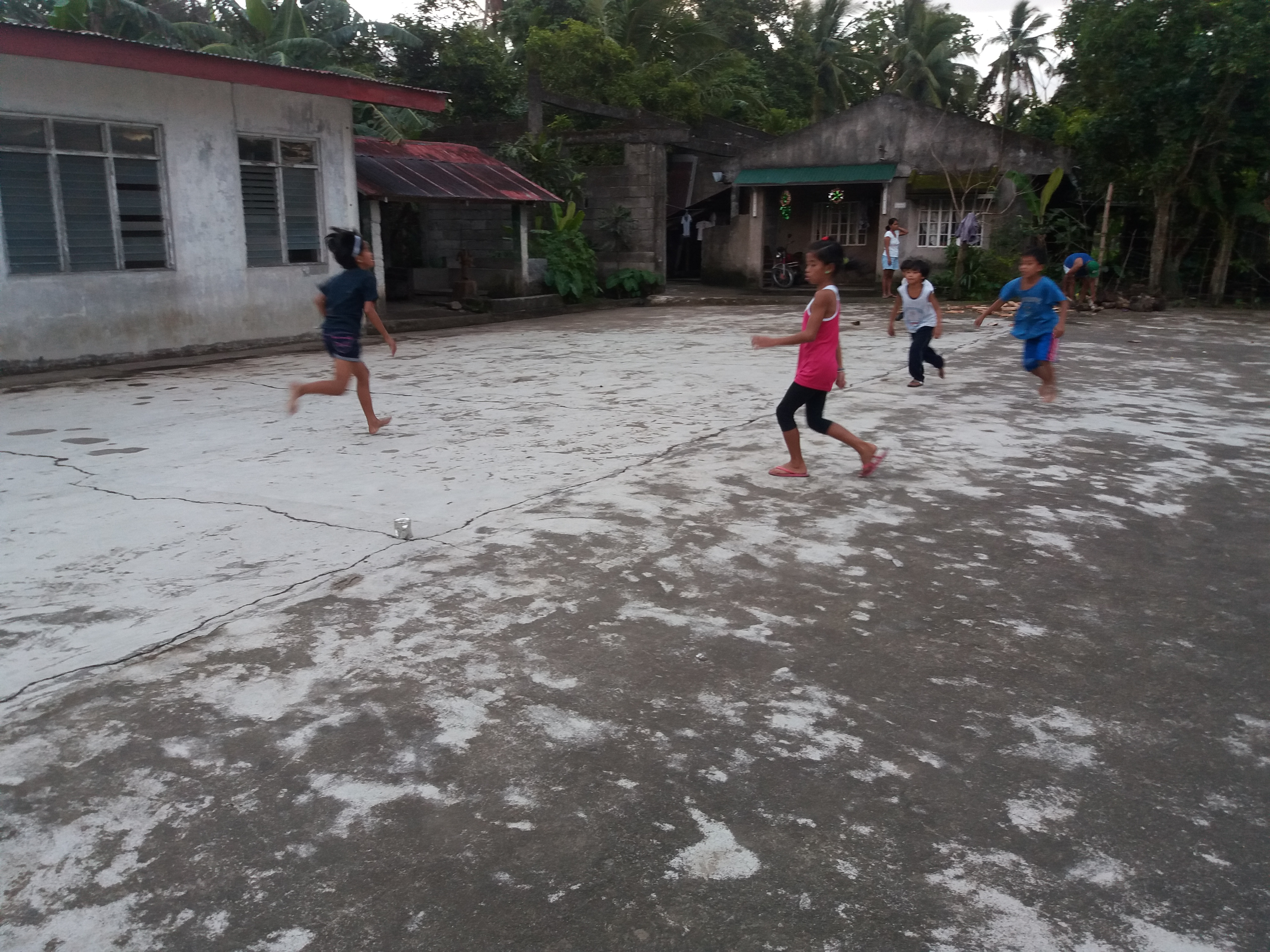
The native game Tumbang preso where the players try to hit the can. This photo was taken in Buhi, Camarines Sur

Tumbang preso ("knock down the prisoner"), also known as tumbang lata ("knock down the can") or bato lata ("hit the can [with a stone]"), is a Filipino traditional children's game. The game involves throwing a slipper at a can or bottle, which one player - the tayà - attempts to guard. The game is usually played in backyards, parks, or streets when there is little traffic in an area.

== Description ==
The equipment needs an empty soda can or any kind of can or bottle, and a slipper for each player. To make the game enjoyable and exciting, there should be no more than nine players. One player or the tayà (the "It") guards the can. The objective is for the players to hit and knock down the can with the slipper, and for the tayà to put back the can inside a small circle a few meters away from the toe-line. When a player is tagged while recovering their slippers, they become the tayà.

== Variation ==
This variation is played on narrow streets or sidewalks. The same rules apply except for some changes:

- Two toe-lines are drawn, on opposite sides, and are closer to the circle.
- The number of hitters will be divided on opposite sides.
- The can may also be flattened a little to make it harder to topple. This can be done by slightly hitting the sides of the can with a blunt object until it folds, then stepping on the can carefully.
- When the hitters run out of slippers, the game turns into a chase. Players on one side will act as bait while those on the other side will try to kick the can, all while trying to avoid being tagged.
- After the can falls, the game is paused and all slippers are retrieved.

== See also ==
- Traditional games in the Philippines – list of traditional Filipino children's games
- Kick the can
- Duck on a rock
