= Traditional games in the Philippines =

Children's competitions in the Southeast Asian country

Traditional Filipino games or indigenous games in the Philippines (Tagalog: Laro ng Lahi) are a diverse set of games passed down through generations, often utilizing native materials and instruments. Historically, Filipino children, faced with limited access to manufactured toys, devised games that required little more than the participation of players. These games vary widely in form and mechanics and are well-suited for children. Beyond recreation, they contribute meaningfully to the physical and cognitive development of young Filipinos and are recognized as an integral aspect of the nation's cultural heritage.

The term Laro ng Lahi was coined and popularized by Samahang Makasining (commonly known as "Makasining"), in collaboration with the National Commission for Culture and the Arts, local government units, and other supporting institutions. A core initiative of the organization involves transmitting knowledge of these traditional games to younger generations. The group also developed a time-based scoring system for several popular games, including patintero, syatong, dama, lusalos, and holen butas.

Traditional Philippine games, such as luksong baka, patintero, piko, and tumbang preso, are played primarily as children's games. The yo-yo, a popular toy in the Philippines, was introduced in its modern form by Pedro Flores, with its name deriving from the Ilocano language.

== Advocates ==
Dickie Aguado, executive director of the Philippine NGO Magna Kultura Foundation, has noted that traditional Filipino games remain "very much alive in the Philippines". In many urban and rural areas, a majority of Filipino children continue to play outdoor street games, often due to limited access to technology. Games such as patintero, tumbang preso, piko, sipa, and trompo are played daily. However, a decline in participation has been observed in areas where Western sports (e.g., basketball or volleyball) are heavily promoted in local barangays and schools. Without organized support for traditional street games, Filipino children may abandon them in favor of modern alternatives.

== Games ==
Traditional Filipino games are usually played outdoors by children alongside their neighbors and friends. These games generally lack strict, formalized rules, with different communities and regions adapting their own agreed-upon variations. Most games involve two teams, with players dividing themselves into roughly equal groups. A common method for team selection involves two designated leaders playing Jack 'n' poy (rock-paper-scissors) and taking turns picking teammates. Another variation involves all players pairing off to play Jack 'n' poy, with the winners forming one team and the losers forming the other. There are more than thirty-eight documented Filipino games. A non-exhaustive list includes:

=== Banana split ===
In this two-player game, participants play rock-paper-scissors. Whenever a player loses a round, they must move their feet further apart. The game continues until a player can no longer stretch their legs, often resulting in the losing player performing a split — hence the pun in the game's name.

=== Declan ruki ===
Declan ruki (lit. I declare, do it!): Similar to the Western game Simon Says, participants are instructed to perform specific actions by the winner of the previous round.

=== Spider fighting (gagamba) ===
Spider fighting (gagamba, lit. 'spider') is a traditional Filipino game involving captured spiders, often referred to locally as kaka, which are typically kept in empty matchboxes. The game serves as a form of recreational combat or gambling, where two spiders are placed on a stick or branch and encouraged to fight. The match continues until one spider falls off or retreats. Spider fighting is commonly practiced by children and enthusiasts, particularly in rural areas, and is considered a part of Filipino folk culture.

=== Hand-clapping games ===
A hand-clapping game generally involves four participants split into two pairs. Each pair faces each other, and both pairs face the center, forming a perpendicular arrangement. The pairs perform a synchronized hand-clapping routine while singing folk songs such as "Bahay Kubo" or "Leron-leron Sinta". In the middle of the song, the pairs exchange routines with each other.

The lyrics to Bahay Kubo are:

Bahay Kubo, kahit munti
Ang halaman doon ay sari-sari
Singkamas at talong
Sigarilyas at mani
Sitaw, bataw, patani
Kundol, patola
Upo't kalabasa
At saka meron pa, labanos, mustasa
Sibuyas, kamatis
Bawang at luya
Sa paligid-ligid ay puno ng linga

Leron-leron Sinta

Leron-leron sinta
Buko ng papaya
Dala-dala'y buslo
Sisidlan ng bunga
Pagdating sa dulo'y
Nabali ang sanga
Kapos kapalaran
Humanap ng iba

Variations:

Gumising ka, neneng
Tayo'y manampalok
Dalhin mo ang buslong
sidlan ng hinog
Pagdating sa dulo'y
Lalamba-lambayog
Kumapit ka, neneng
Baka ka mahulog

Leron, leron sinta
Buko ng papaya
Dala-dala'y buslo
Sisidlan ng sinta
Pagdating sa dulo'y
Nabali ang sanga
Kapos kapalaran
Humanap ng iba

Ako'y ibigin mo
Lalaking matapang
Ang baril ko'y pito
Ang sundang ko'y siyam
Ang lalakarin ko'y
Parte ng dinulang
Isang pinggang pansit
Ang aking kalaban

Leron, leron sinta
Buko ng papaya
Dala-dala'y buslo
Sisidlan ng sinta
Pagdating sa dulo'y
Nabali ang sanga
Kapos kapalaran
Humanap ng iba

A variation of the game incorporates physical actions corresponding to the lyrics. An example is "Si Nena", a song chronicling the life of a girl named Nena from birth to death. As the song progresses, the players act out the stages of her life (baby, young lady, mother, deceased, and ghost). During the final verse, one player acts as a ghost and attempts to catch the other players.

Lyrics for Si Nena:

Si Nena ay bata pa, kaya ang sabi nya ay um um um ah ah (players perform a baby action)
Si Nena ay dalaga na, kaya ang sabi nya ay um um um ah ah (players perform a lady action)
Si Nena ay nanay na, kaya ang sabi nya ay um um um ah ah (players perform a mother action)
Si Nena ay namatay na, kaya ang sabi nya ay um um um ah ah (players perform a dead action)
Si Nena ay mumu na, kaya ang sabi nya ay um um um ah ah (players perform a ghost action)

Another popular clapping song is Nanay, Tatay:

Nanay, Tatay, gusto ko tinapay
Ate, Kuya, gusto ko kape,
Lahat ng gusto ko ay susundin niyo.
Ang magkamali ay pipingutin ko... (clap 5x)

The song continues with increasing numbers of claps.

=== Hwego de anilyo ===
Hwego de anilyo (lit. game of rings) is a game of Spanish influence, derived from the medieval sport of running at the ring. It traditionally involves riding a horse while holding a dagger to "catch" rings hanging from a tree or structure. In recent years, a bicycle is typically used instead of a horse.

=== Jakempoy ===
Jakempoy (also spelled Jack en poy, Dyak en poy, or Dyakempoy) is the local version of rock-paper-scissors (bato, papel, at gunting). While the spelling suggests American influence, the game is Japanese in origin (janken), with the accompanying chant sounding akin to the Japanese lyrics.

The standard chant is:

Jakempoy, hale-hale-hoy! (Jack and Poy, hale-hale-hoy!)
Sinong matalo s'yang unggoy! (Whoever loses is the monkey!)

=== Juego de prenda ===
Juego de prenda (lit. game of looking for the missing bird) accommodates any number of players. Participants sit in a circle with a leader in the middle. Each player is assigned the name of a tree or flower by the leader. The leader recounts a story about a king's lost bird, stating, "The bird of the king was lost yesterday. Did you find it, ylang-ylang?" The player assigned the ylang-ylang tree must immediately deny finding it, prompting the leader to ask another "tree." If a player fails to answer within three seconds, they must surrender a personal possession to the leader as a penalty. The game continues until the leader has collected multiple items, which are later redeemed through playful forfeits.

=== Piko ===
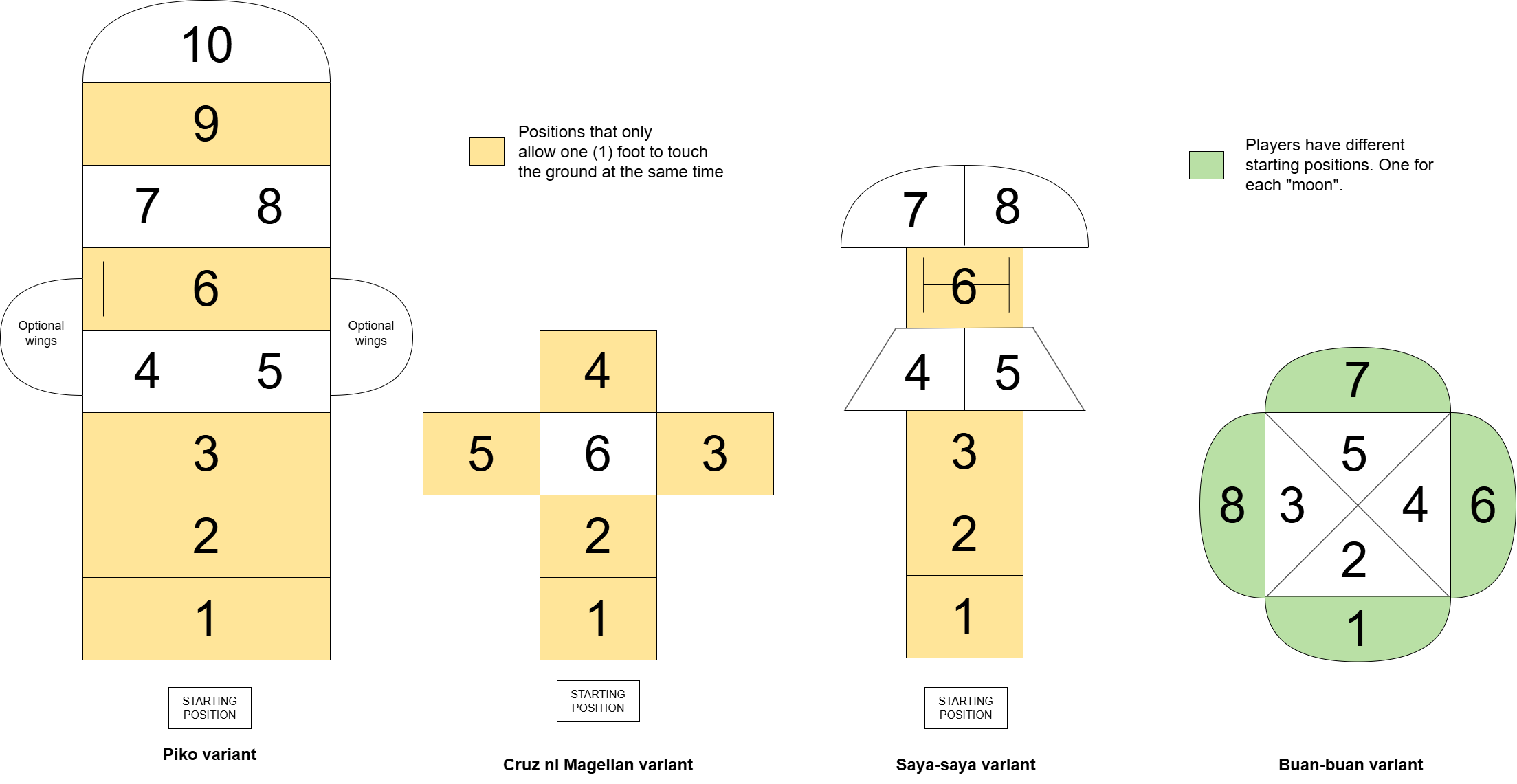
A diagram of Philippine hopscotch variants

Piko is the Philippine variation of hopscotch. It is traditionally played outdoors using a diagram of boxes drawn on the ground, commonly in the shape of a cross or a stylized human figure.

Players begin by standing behind a baseline and taking turns throwing a pamato (a cue marker, often a flat stone or tile) onto a designated box. The starting order is typically determined by an informal contest, such as who can throw their marker closest to a specific target on the diagram (e.g., the "moon," "wings," "chest," or "I" markings). The game proceeds with each player hopping through the course on one foot, except in boxes that allow both feet. Players must skip the box containing their pamato and retrieve it on their way back. A player is disqualified from their turn if they step on a line, lose their balance, or make an error in the sequence.

Upon successfully completing a sequence, a player earns the right to claim a box. Once claimed, the box becomes off-limits to other players, who must jump over it. This rule increases the difficulty of the game. Optional "wings" may be drawn alongside the main course to accommodate longer jumps.

Across the Philippines, piko is known by various regional names. In the Ilocos Region, it is called kingking. In Cebu and some Visayan-speaking areas, it is referred to as bikabix, kiki, or vicks-vicks (reportedly due to the use of Vicks VapoRub caps as markers). In parts of Mindanao and the Visayas, it is known as buan-buan. Among Waray speakers, it is called saya-saya, derived from the word saya, meaning "skirt".

=== Sambunot ===
Sambunot is an outdoor game played by ten to twenty participants. The objective is to retrieve a coconut husk from the center of a circle.

A circle is drawn on the ground, large enough to accommodate all players, and a coconut husk is placed in the center. At the signal "go", players rush to the center to grab the husk. Players may wrestle or steal the husk from one another in an attempt to carry it outside the circle. The first player to successfully exit the circle with the husk wins the round.

=== Sipa ===
Sipa (lit. game of kicking): The object used to play the game is also called a sipa. It is traditionally made of a metal washer with colorful threads or plastic straws attached to it. Alternatively, it can be played using a woven rattan ball or a lead washer covered in cloth. The player throws the sipa upwards and must keep it airborne by kicking it with their foot or hitting it just above the knee. The objective is to achieve the highest number of consecutive kicks without letting the sipa touch the ground. Sipa was the national sport of the Philippines until 2009.

The mechanics of sipa are similar to the Western game of hackysack. It is also played professionally by Filipino athletes using a woven ball, known as sepak takraw, with rules borrowed from Indonesia.

=== Sikaran ===
Sikaran is a traditional Filipino martial art that involves hand and foot fighting, though the term is generally used to describe kicking techniques. It is also used as the name for the kicking aspects of other Filipino martial arts.

Hari Osias Banaag, founder of the Global Sikaran Federation, has served as a diplomat for the sport and was appointed to the UNESCO Ad hoc Advisory Committee on Traditional Sports and Games (TSG).

=== Taguan ===
Taguan, or tagu-taguan (lit. twilight game, look out, cover yourself! or take-cover game!): This is the Filipino variant of hide and seek. What distinguishes taguan is that it is traditionally played at sunset or at night, adding a level of difficulty for the it (the seeker). In some regions, such as Laguna and Cavite, it is even played in caves. The it must recite a specific chant before seeking:

Tagu-taguan, maliwanag ang buwan (Hide and seek, the moon is bright)
Masarap maglaro sa kadiliman ng buwan (It is fun to play in the semi-dark night)
Pagkabilang kong sampu (When I finish counting up to ten)
Nakatago na kayo (All of you should already be hidden)
Isa, dalawa, ... tatlo! (One, two, ... three!)

Alternative chants include:

Tagu-taguan, maliwanag ang buwan (Hide and seek, the moon is bright)
Wala sa likod, wala sa harap (Nobody in front, nobody behind)
Pagkabilang kong sampu (When I finish counting up to ten)
Nakatago na kayo (All of you should already be hidden)
Isa, dalawa, ... tatlo! (One, two, ... three!)

and:

Tagu-taguan, maliwanag ang buwan (Hide and seek, the moon is bright)
Tayo maglaro ng tagu-taguan (Let's play hide and seek)
Isa, dalawa, ... umalis ka na sa puwestohan mo (One, two, ... leave that spot)

== Stick games ==
=== Bati-cobra ===
Bati-cobra is an outdoor hitting and catching game played by two or more participants.

The game requires two bamboo sticks (one long, one short). One player acts as the batter and stands opposite the other players at a distance. The batter holds the long stick in one hand, tosses the short stick into the air with the other, and strikes the short stick forward. The other players attempt to catch the flying stick. If a player catches it, they become the next batter. If the stick falls to the ground, any player can pick it up. The batter then places the long stick on the ground, and the player holding the short stick throws it in an attempt to hit the long stick. If successful, the thrower becomes the next batter; if they miss, the original batter retains their turn.

=== Tsato/Syato ===
Tsato (lit. stick game) (also spelled syato, syatong, chatong, or shatungs) is a traditional stick game played primarily in rural areas. It involves two players, a long flat stick (usually 3 feet (0.91 m)), and a shorter stick (4 inches (100 mm)). The game is known by various names across different regions: in Tagalog and Ilocano, it is called syato or syatong; in Visayan regions, it is referred to as pityaw, pikyaw, pitiw, chato, chatong, or shatungs.

The objective is to strike the shorter stick so that it flies into the air, and then hit it again midair to send it as far as possible. Points are awarded based on the distance the stick travels, usually measured in stick lengths. The game is traditionally played on bare ground, where a shallow, slanted hole is dug to position the shorter stick at an angle.

One player acts as the hitter while the other acts as the catcher. The hitter propels the small stick into the air and strikes it forward. To increase their score, a player may attempt to tap the small stick twice in the air before hitting it forward; in this case, points are measured using the shorter stick's length instead of the longer one.

If the catcher successfully intercepts the stick midair, the hitter earns no points, and the roles are reversed. If the hitter misses the stick entirely, the turn passes to the other player. In some variations, the losing player is penalized by having to hop on one foot from where the stick landed back to the starting hole.

Tsato bears resemblance to other traditional stick games found across Southeast Asia, reflecting the resourcefulness and playful creativity characteristic of Filipino folk culture.

== Throwing games ==
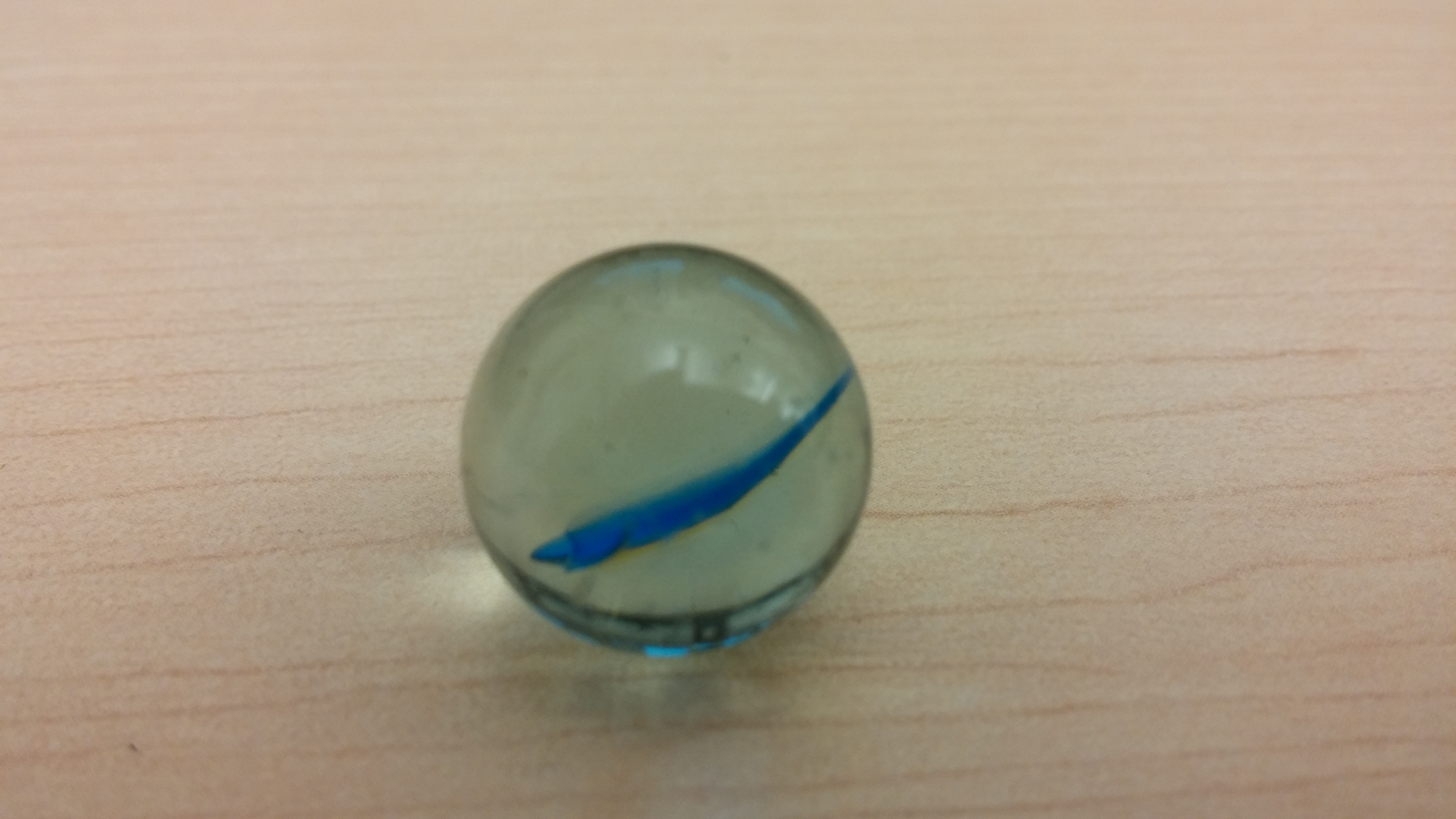
A glass marble called "Holen" or "Jolen" used in the game

=== Holen ===
Derived from the phrase "hole in", holen (or jolen) is the Filipino variation of marbles. Players hold a glass marble and throw or flick it to hit opponents' marbles out of the playing area. The marble is typically flicked using the middle finger, with the thumb tucked underneath and the fourth finger providing stability. Players aim at grouped marbles inside a drawn circle; any marble knocked out of the circle is claimed by the thrower. The player who collects the most marbles wins. Players can also win by directly hitting and eliminating opponents' marbles.

Another variation involves digging three holes in the ground at set distances. Players attempt to complete a circuit, traveling to all the holes and back in order. The first to complete the circuit wins. During the game, players can knock opponents' marbles away to hinder their progress.

=== Kalahoyo ===
Kalahoyo (lit. hole-in) is an outdoor game played by two to ten players, emphasizing accurate targeting. The objective is to hit small objects called anak using a larger, flat stone called a pamato, attempting to knock the anak into a small hole.

A small hole is dug in the ground, and a throwing line is drawn approximately 5 to 6 meters (16 to 20 ft) away. A longer line is drawn between the hole and the throwing line. All the anak are placed on the throwing line. Players take turns throwing their pamato from the line into the hole; the player whose pamato lands closest to or inside the hole gets the first turn. The first thrower attempts to hit the anak into the hole. The game continues until only one anak remains outside the hole. The player whose anak is left outside is declared the loser (alila or muchacho) and is penalized by the winners. The punishment involves the winners repeatedly throwing their pamato to hit their own anak, while the loser is forced to constantly retrieve and return the pamato until the winners miss or decide to stop.

=== Siklot ===
Siklot (meaning "to flick") is a game of throwing stones similar to knucklebones. It uses a large number of small stones that are tossed in the air and caught on the back of the hand. The stones that remain on the hand are collected and referred to as biik ("piglets") or baboy ("pig"). The player with the most biik plays the second stage first. In the second stage, the stones that fell on the ground are flicked into each other; if they collide, they are collected. This continues until a player misses, at which point the turn passes to the next player. Siklot is also the name of a traditional game of pick up sticks among the Lumad people of Mindanao.

=== Sintak ===
Sintak (also called kuru or balinsay) is another indigenous game similar to knucklebones. Instead of a bouncing ball, it uses a larger stone called ina-ina ("mother") that the player tosses into the air and must catch before it hits the ground. While the ina-ina is airborne, the player must gather smaller stones, seeds, or cowries called anak ("children"). All actions are performed with one hand. The game consists of multiple stages of increasing difficulty, such as kuhit-kuhit, agad-silid, hulog-bumbong, sibara, laglag-bunga, and lukob. The final stage is known as pipi, where the losing player is flicked on the knuckles by the winner.

=== Slipper game (slipper box) ===
Popular among children and teenagers in the Visayas region, this outdoor team game involves two groups using slippers (flip-flops) as the primary object. The starting team stacks their slippers (usually 2–3 levels high) and throws one high into the air to commence the game. The opposing team must enter a designated parameter and attempt to dodge slippers thrown by the starting team. If a player is hit, they are eliminated, but they can be redeemed if their teammates manage to catch or retrieve the thrown slippers. The throwing team wins if they eliminate all opposing players, after which the teams exchange roles.

== Maneuvering games ==
=== Chinese garter ===
This game involves jumping over a stretched garter. Gameplay setups vary based on agreed-upon rules:

- Two players per team: Two players take turns jumping. If one misses, the other continues.
- Three players per team: Three players work together; any missed jump transfers to the next player.
- Solo game: A single player aims to clear as many levels as possible.
- All-in-one team play: All team members jump sequentially in a single round, and progress is judged collectively.

=== Luksong tinik ===
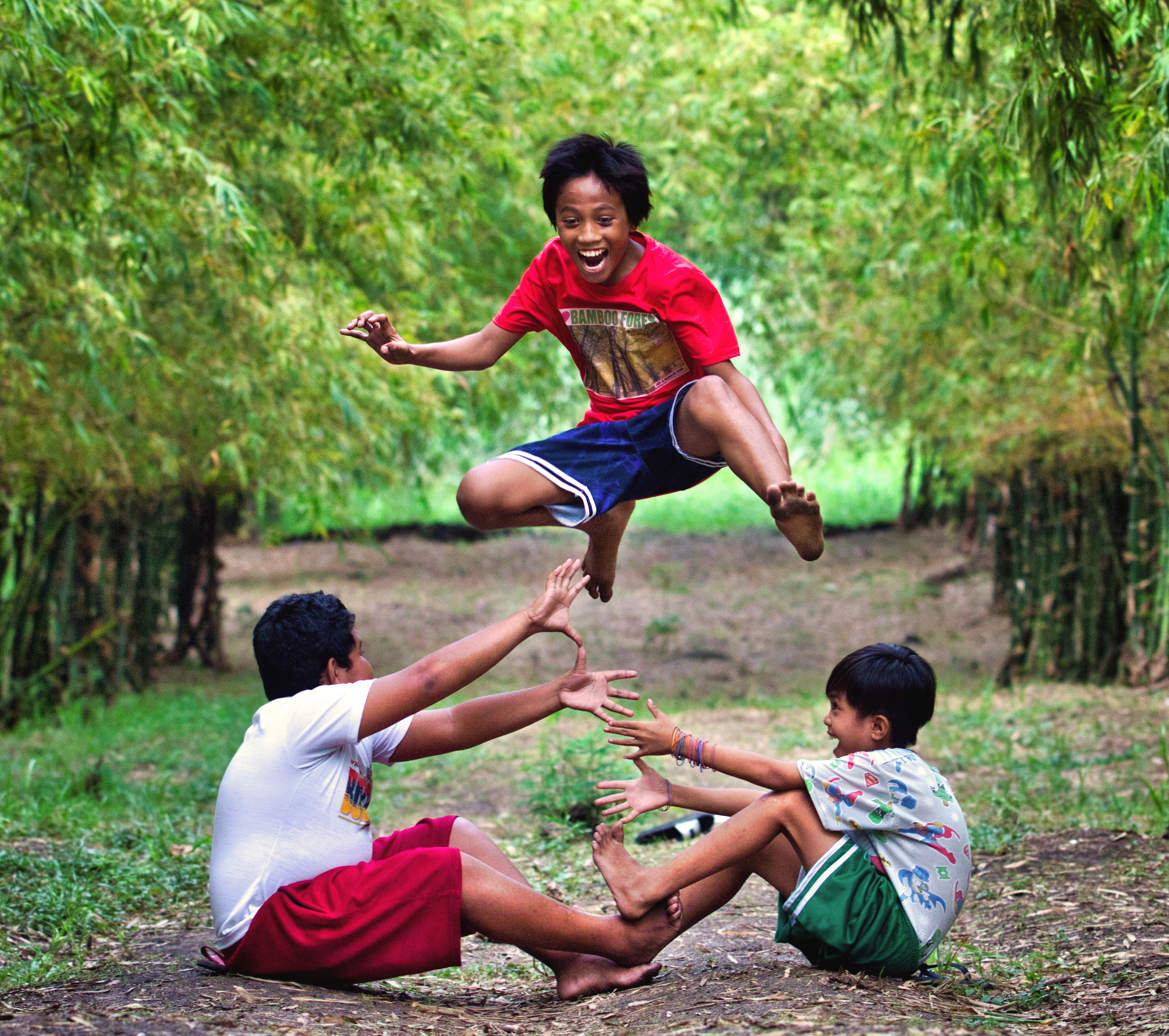
Luksong tinik

Luksong tinik (lit. jump over the thorns of a plant): Two players serve as the base (the tinik or thorn) by stacking their feet and hands together to gradually build a barrier. The other players must take a running start and jump over the tinik without touching it. If a jumper hits the hands or feet of the base players, they are penalized and may be forced to switch roles.

=== Luksong-baka ===
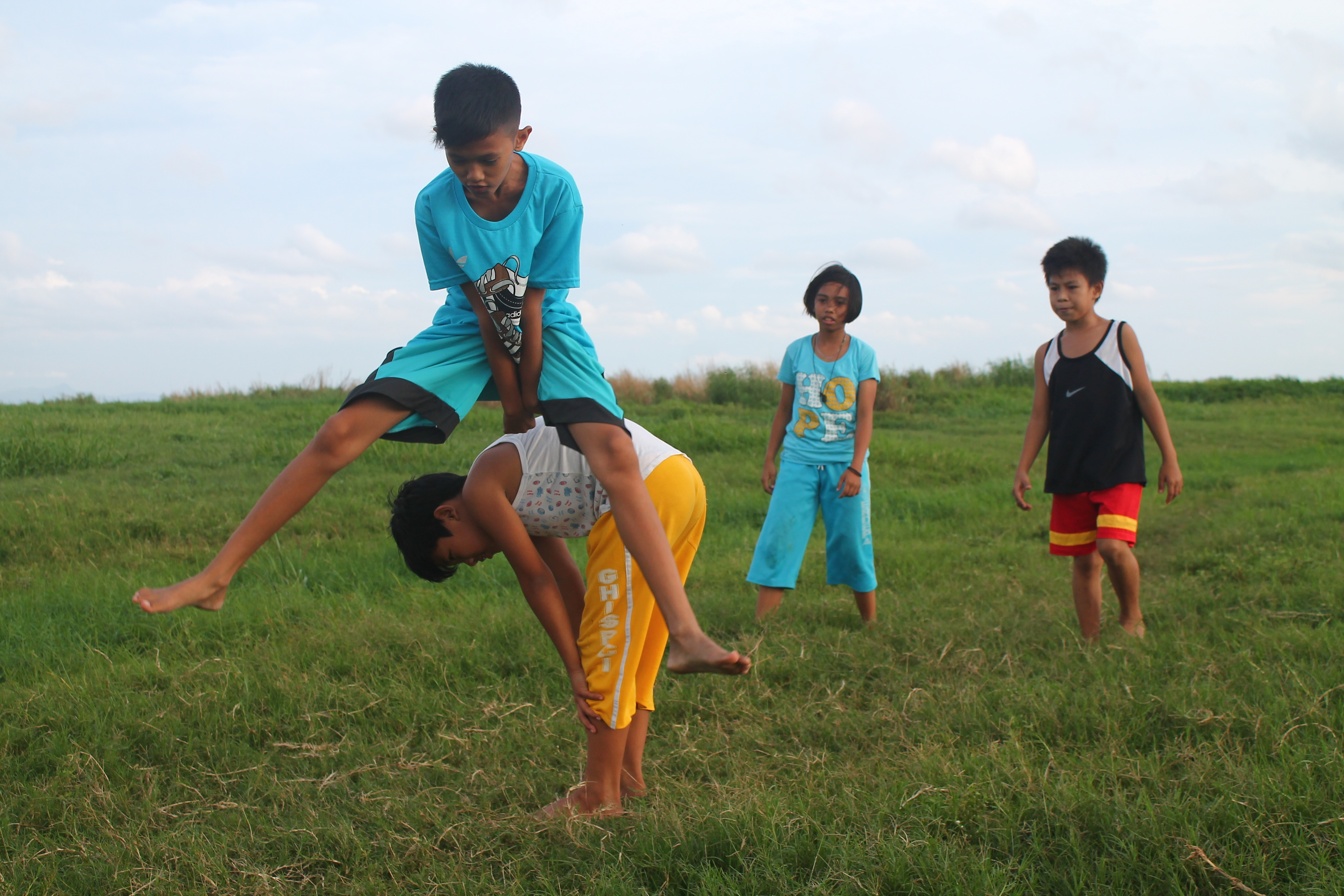
Luksong baka

Luksong-baka (lit. jump over the cow) is a variation of luksong tinik and the Filipino equivalent of leapfrog. One player crouches (acting as the baka or cow) while the others jump over them. The crouching player gradually stands up as the game progresses, making the jump more difficult. If a jumper touches the baka while jumping, they become the new baka.

=== Palosebo ===
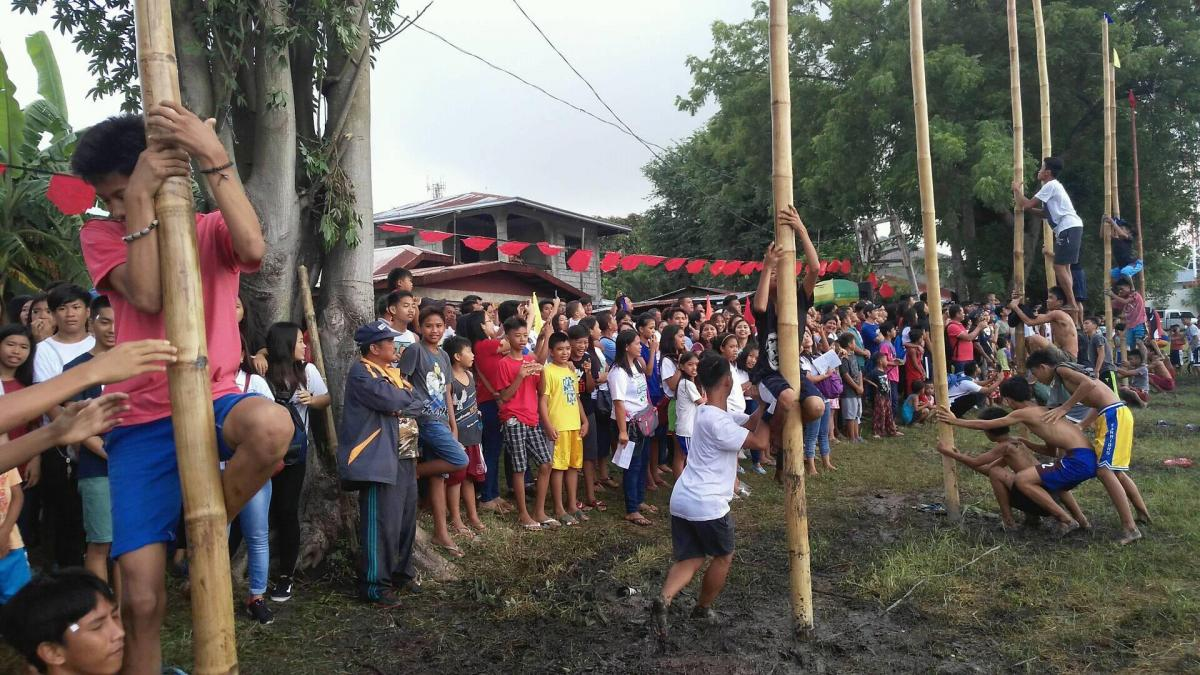
Palosebo

Palosebo (lit. greased bamboo pole climbing): Often played during town fiestas, this game involves participants attempting to climb a greased bamboo pole. The objective is to be the first to reach a small bag tied at the top, which usually contains prize money or toys.

=== Ten-twenty ===
This game involves two pairs of players and a stretched garter. One pair stands facing each other, stretching the garter around their ankles to form two parallel lines. The other pair performs a jumping routine over the garters while chanting "ten, twenty, thirty..." up to one hundred. The game progresses through levels, with the garter being raised higher (e.g., to the knees, waist, and neck) as the jumpers attempt to complete their routines without error.

=== Tinikling ===
A game variant of the traditional tinikling dance. The objective is for players to step and dance nimbly between two clapping bamboo poles without getting their ankles caught. If a player is caught, they replace one of the players holding the bamboo poles.

=== Tiyakad ===
Kadang-kadang, karang (in Bisaya), or tiyakad (in Tagalog) refers to a bamboo stilt-walking game. Originating in Cebu, it is a racing game that requires balance and concentration. It was popularized as a team event during the Laro ng Lahi (Game of the Races), a traditional sports initiative by the Bureau of Physical Education and School Sports (BPESS). Historically, elders played it recreationally or used stilts to walk after completing household chores.

== Guessing games ==
=== Bulong-Pari ===
Bulong-Pari (lit. whisper it to the priest) involves two teams (Team A and Team B) and one player acting as the it or "priest". The leader of Team A approaches the priest and whispers the name of a player from Team B. The priest then calls out, "Lapit!" ("Approach!"). A player from Team B steps forward; if they are the person whose name was whispered, the priest shouts "Boom!" or "Bung!", and that player becomes a prisoner.

=== Patay patayan (guess the killer) ===
Also known as "killer eye", this game requires at least four players who draw roles from folded paper slips: one judge, one killer, one police officer, and regular citizens. The killer attempts to "kill" other players by secretly winking at them. If a regular citizen is winked at, they must announce, "I'm dead!" The police officer must identify the killer before the killer manages to wink at the judge. If the killer successfully winks at the judge without being caught, the judge announces, "I'm dead, but I'm the judge," and the round ends.

=== Pitik-bulag ===
This two-player game involves one player covering their eyes with one hand while the other player flicks (pitik) a finger against the covering hand. Simultaneously, both players hold up a certain number of fingers on their free hand. If the numbers match, they exchange roles. In another variation, the blindfolded player (bulag) must guess which specific finger the other player used to flick them.

=== Takip-silim ===
Takip-silim: One player is designated as the taya ("it"). The taya is blindfolded and counts to ten while the other players hide. The taya must then find and tag at least one player, and correctly guess their identity by touch. If the guess is correct, the tagged player becomes the new taya.

== Games involving simple objects ==
=== Teks ===
Teks or teks game cards: Filipino children collect small playing cards featuring comic strips and text in speech balloons. The game is played by tossing the cards into the air and betting on how they will land. The cards are flipped using the thumb and forefinger, creating a snapping sound. The winner collects the other players' cards based on whether the cards land face up or face down. A variant of the game uses circular cardboard discs known as pogs.

=== Trompo ===
A trompo is a traditional wooden top spun by winding a string around its body and launching it so it lands spinning on its metal point. Players can control the top's movement or lift it onto other surfaces using the string.

=== Dampa ===
Dampa is a game played with rubber bands. Players cup their hands to form a dome with a small opening at the tip. By striking the ground with their cupped hands, they force air out, propelling the rubber bands forward. The objective is to be the first player to move their rubber band across a designated finish line.

== Variations of tag ==
=== Agawan base ===
Agawan base (lit. catch and own a corner): The it stands in the middle of the playing area while other players occupy designated corners or bases. The players attempt to exchange places by running between bases. The it tries to secure a base by rushing to it while it is vacant. This is also known as agawang sulok or bilaran.

==== Sekyu base or Moro Moro ====
Sekyu base is a team-based variation of agawan base. Each of the two teams has a "base" (e.g., a tree or a post). The objective is to touch the enemy's base and shout "Sekyubase!" without being tagged. Players who leave their base are vulnerable to being tagged and captured by the enemy. Captured players must link hands to form a human chain extending from the enemy base; their teammates can rescue them by tagging the hand of the outermost prisoner.

=== Araw-lilim ===
Araw-lilim (lit. sun and shade): The it can only tag players who are standing in direct sunlight; players are safe as long as they remain in the shade.

=== Bahay-bahayan ===
A role-playing game where children construct imaginary houses using curtains, spare wood, ropes, or other household items, assigning family roles to each participant.

=== Iring-iring ===
Iring-iring (lit. go round and round until the hanky drops): Players sit in a circle while the it walks around the outside, secretly dropping a handkerchief behind one of the players. Once the player notices the handkerchief, they must pick it up and chase the it around the circle. The it must reach the vacant spot before being tagged; otherwise, they remain the it.

=== Kapitang bakod ===
Kapitang bakod (lit. touch the post, or you're it!): Players are safe from being tagged by the it as long as they are holding onto a fence, a post, or any designated wooden or bamboo object.

=== Langit-lupa ===
Langit-lupa (lit. heaven and earth): The it chases players who are allowed to run on level ground (lupa) or climb onto elevated objects (langit). The it may only tag players who are on the ground. A tagged player becomes the new it.

A chant is typically used to select the first it, recited while pointing at players one by one. The player being pointed to when the final syllable lands is eliminated from contention, and the process repeats until only one player remains — that player becomes the taya. In an alternative selection method, players extend one foot into the center of the circle instead of standing in place, and the pointer works through the offered feet rather than the players themselves.

Langit, lupa impyerno, im – im – impyerno (Heaven, earth, hell, he-he-hell)
Sak-sak puso tulo ang dugo (Stabbed heart, dripping in blood)
Patay, buhay, Umalis ka na sa pwesto mong mabaho! (Dead, alive, get out of your stinky spot!)

To prevent players from staying elevated indefinitely, rules often require them to descend after a certain count.

A regional variant of the chant substitutes references to popular Filipino entertainers from the latter half of the twentieth century, reflecting how the game's oral tradition incorporated contemporary popular culture:

Langit, lupa, impyerno, im – im – impyerno (Heaven, earth, hell, he-he-hell)
Max Alvarado, barado ang ilong (Max Alvarado has a stuffy nose!)
Tony Ferrer, mahilig sa buldak (Tony Ferrer is fond of guns!)
Vivian Velez, mahilig sa alis! (Vivian Velez is fond of... Get out!)

A gameplay variant known as balikbayan allows a player who has just been tagged to immediately tag the tagger back, preventing any single player from easily being stuck with the role of it.

=== Lagundi ===
A game of Indian influence. It operates similarly to standard tag, but players are divided into two teams. The team acting as the it passes a ball among themselves and attempts to tag opponents by touching the ball to their heads.

=== Lawin at sisiw ===
Lawin at sisiw (lit. Hawk and Chicken): Played by ten or more participants, this game features one player as the "hawk," one as the "hen," and the rest as "chickens." The chickens form a line behind the hen, holding onto each other's waists. The hawk attempts to catch the chickens, while the hen actively blocks the hawk's path.

The game begins with the hawk "buying" a chicken from the hen and leading it away, instructing it to hunt for food before going to sleep. While the hawk sleeps, the chicken slips back to the protection of the hen. When the hawk wakes and discovers the chicken has returned, it attempts to recapture it while the hen and the remaining chickens form a moving shield. If the hawk catches the chicken, it is taken as a captive; if not, the hawk must attempt to buy another chicken and the sequence repeats.

=== Patintero ===
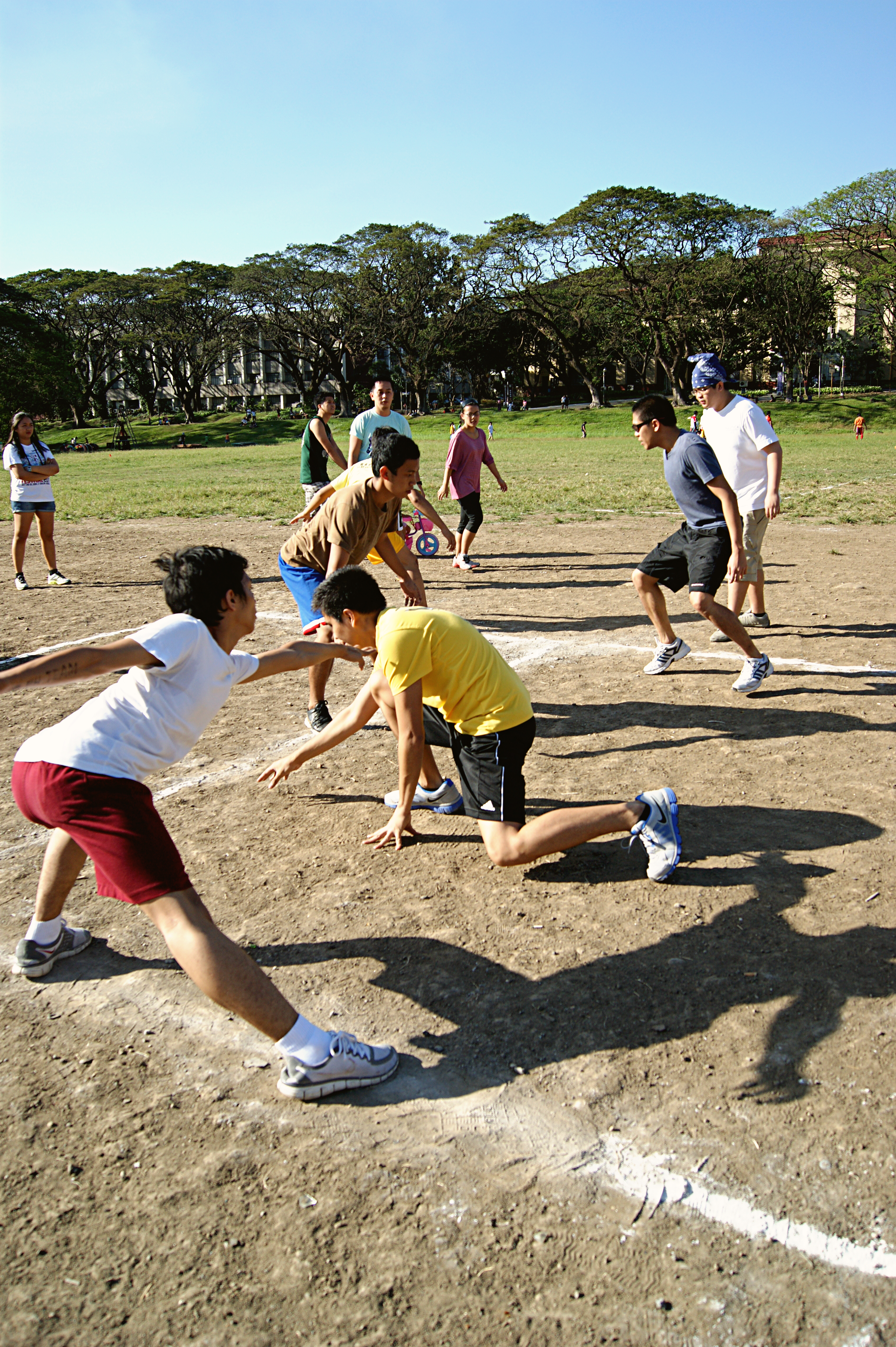
Patintero

Patintero (also called harangang taga or tubigan): Two teams of five players compete as attackers and defenders. The playing area is a grid of rectangles. The defending team (the it) stands on the grid lines and attempts to tag the attackers. The attackers must cross the grid from the home base to the back end and return without being tagged. If an attacker is tagged, the teams switch roles. The game shares similarities with the Korean squid game and the Indian game atya-patya.

In 1997, Samahang Makasining introduced a time-based scoring format for competitive play, similar to basketball. Each team fields six players (four active, two substitutes), and the attacking team has 20 minutes to cross the grid from the home base to the back end and return. Points are awarded per line crossed: two points per line going away from the home base and three points per line on the return, plus five bonus points for completing the full circuit, for a maximum of 25 points per completed run: (2 × 4) + (3 × 4) + 5 = 25.

=== Presohan ===
See tumbang preso and patay patayan.

=== Tumbang preso ===
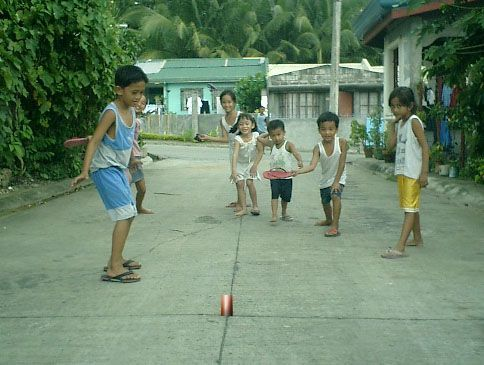
Tumbang preso

Tumbang preso (also known as presohan in Luzon, and tumba-patis or tumba-lata in the Visayas) is a popular street game where players use their slippers (pamato) to knock down a tin can guarded by the taya (it).

The taya stands near the can, while the other players stand behind a designated throwing line and take turns throwing their slippers to knock it over. A key rule governs tagging: the taya may only tag a player who is approaching with their pamato in hand while the can is upright. Once the can is knocked over, the taya must stand it back up before resuming the chase, giving players a window to retrieve their slippers in safety. If a player is tagged while retrieving their slipper, they become the new taya. Players can also be penalized for rule violations, including stepping on or beyond the throwing line, kicking the can directly, or touching it with their hands.

In regional variations common in Visayan areas and parts of Southern Luzon, an additional rule applies: the taya must balance their own pamato on top of the upright can. Even after standing the can up, the taya may not tag anyone if the slipper has fallen off — they must replace it first.

=== Ubusan lahi ===
Ubusan lahi (lit. clannicide): A game of tag where the it attempts to "conquer" members of another clan, typically between five to ten players. When a player is tagged, they join the it and help tag the remaining players. The game continues until all players have been tagged. This is also known as bansai or lipunan.

=== Methods of choosing the it ===
==== Sawsaw-suka ====
Sawsaw-suka (lit. dip it into vinegar): This is a common method used to determine the taya or it (the tagger) in a game. One player holds one or both hands open, palms facing up. The other players repeatedly tap the open palms with their index fingers while chanting, "Sawsaw suka, mahuli taya!" (Dip into the vinegar, whoever gets caught is it!). On the last syllable of the word "taya", the player with open hands quickly closes them. Whoever's finger gets caught becomes the new it. The tapping motion emulates dipping food into vinegar, hence the name. Another variation of the chant is "Sawsaw suka, mapaso taya" ("Dip into the vinegar, whoever gets burned is it").

==== Kampihan / Sinong nag-iiba ====
Players gather in a circle and simultaneously thrust their hands forward, showing either their palms up or palms down.

- In kampihan (lit. making teams), players are divided into two teams based on whether their palms are facing up or down. If the resulting teams are significantly uneven, the process is repeated.
- In sinong nag-iiba (lit. whoever is different), the single player whose hand gesture (palm up or palm down) differs from the rest of the group is chosen as the it.

== Racing games ==
=== Sangkayaw (coconut shell race) ===
Sangkayaw is a traditional racing game played in Central Luzon. This game uses coconut shells tied to strings. Players stand on the coconut shells, gripping the string between their big toe and index toe, while holding the other end of the string with their hands to pull the shells upward as they walk.

=== Tiyakad or Kadang-kadang ===
Kadang-kadang, also known as tiyakad in Tagalog, is a traditional Filipino racing game played using bamboo stilts. The term kadang-kadang translates roughly to "simple play" and reflects its recreational nature. The game is typically featured during larong lahi events, which celebrate Filipino indigenous games and cultural heritage.

The game was first documented in Cebu in 1969. Players use a pair of bamboo poles of equal length, each equipped with a footrest or platform sized to accommodate the player's feet. Traditionally, the stilts measure approximately 10 feet (3 meters) in height, although modern versions may use taller or adjustable stilts depending on the players' skill level. Kadang-kadang is primarily a test of balance, coordination, and speed, with players racing each other while walking or running on the stilts.

== Board games ==
=== Dama ===
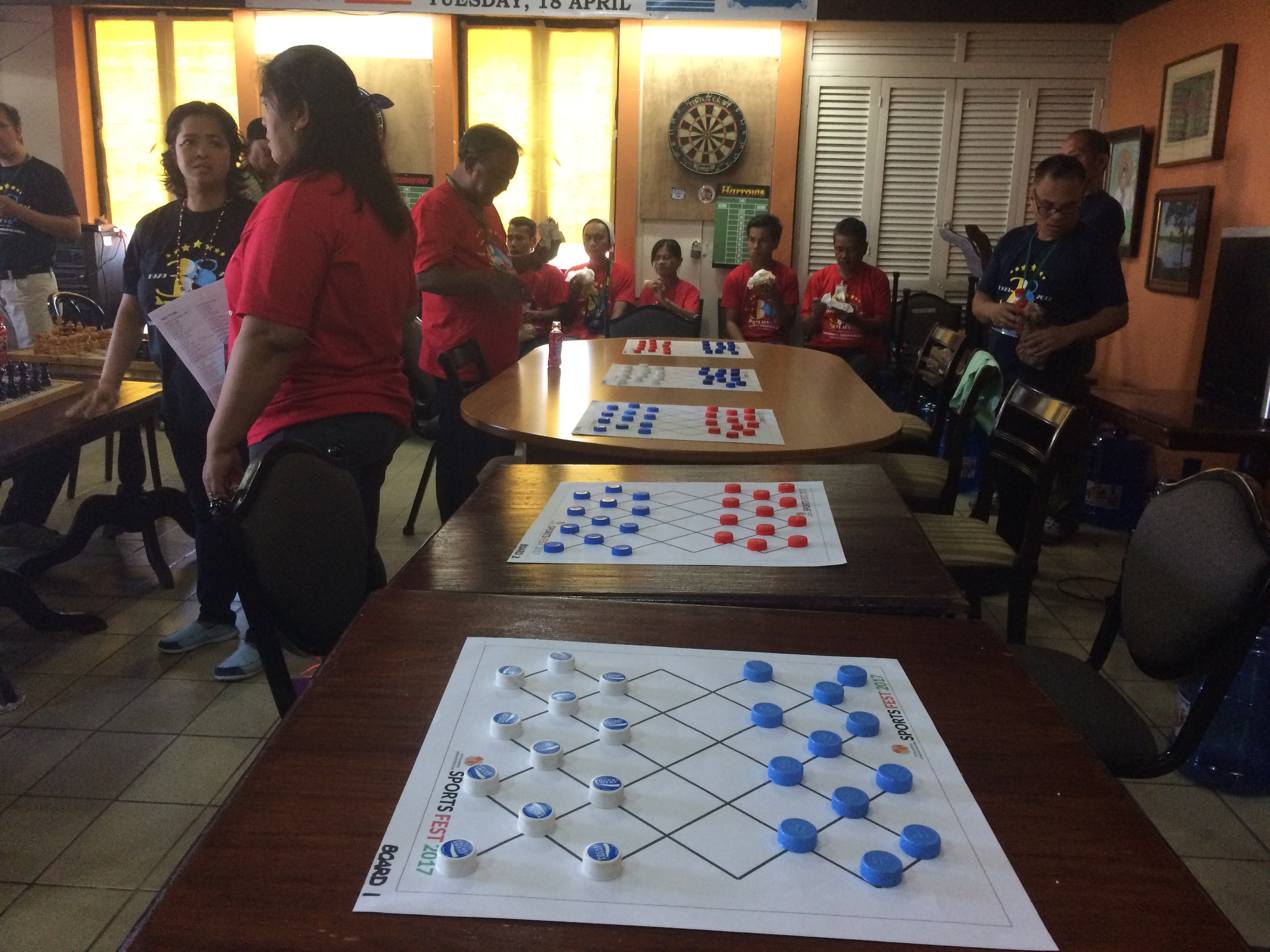
Dama

Dama is a game with leaping captures played in the Philippines, similar to draughts or checkers.

The board consists of a 5x5 grid of points, with points connected by diagonal lines. Twelve pieces per player are positioned on the first three rows closest to the player. Players take turns moving a piece forward to an empty adjacent spot along the lines. A player may capture an opponent's piece by hopping over it to an empty spot on the opposite side.

Multiple captures are allowed in a single turn. When a player's piece reaches the opposite edge of the board, it becomes a "king." Kings may move any distance diagonally forward or backward and may capture any number of opponent's pieces it leaps over, though it cannot change directions during a single multiple-capture turn. The first player to capture all of the opponent's pieces wins.

==== Damath / Scidama ====
Damath (sometimes stylized as Scidama) is an educational variation of dama played in schools and briefly introduced by the Department of Education (DepEd). It uses an 8×8 board similar to a chessboard, with each landing square labeled with a mathematical symbol: \({+}\), \({-}\), \({\times}\), or \({\div}\). Each of the players' pieces is labeled with numbers ranging up to three digits. The name Damath is a portmanteau of dama and math, while Scidama blends science and dama. The goal of the game is to strategically lose pieces or capture pieces to accumulate the lowest possible score. After computation and tallying, the player with the lesser total score is declared the winner.

=== Lusalos ===
Lusalos is the general Philippine equivalent of the game Nine men's morris.

=== Tapatan ===
Tapatan is the general Philippine equivalent of the game Three men's morris. The rules are exactly the same as those of Three Men's Morris, where players attempt to align three pieces in a row, and pieces can only move to adjacent points.

=== Sungka ===
Sungka is a Philippine mancala game popular both locally and in the diaspora (e.g., in Macau, Taiwan, Germany, and the United States). Like the closely related congkak, it was traditionally a women's game. Sungka has historically been used by fortunetellers and prophets (bailan or maghuhula) for divinatory purposes, most commonly to determine whether a young person's future is auspicious — whether they will marry, and if so, when. According to tradition, the game should be played outdoors, as playing it indoors is believed to risk burning the house down. In the Anay district of Panay, the losing player is traditionally said to be patay ("dead"), with the folk belief that a death in the family or a house fire may follow.

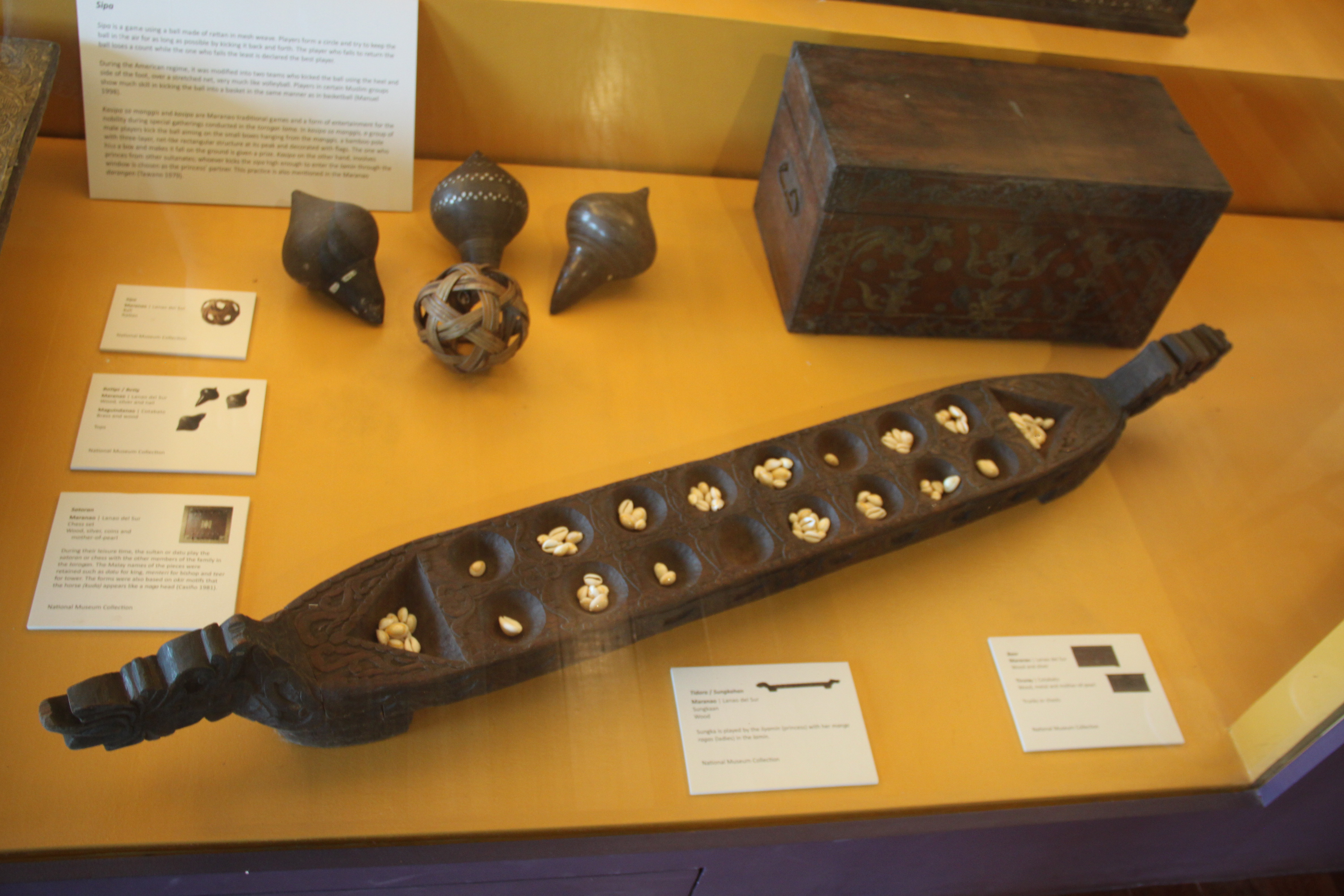
Filipino boat-shaped sungkâ with cowrie shell seeds, along with sipà (rattan wicker ball) and kakasing (tops)

The game is played on a carved wooden board (often made of mahogany) featuring seven small dips or holes on each side called bahay (houses), and two larger holes at either end called ulo (head) or inay (mother). The premise of the game is to collect more shells (usually cowrie shells) or stones than the opponent.

Each small pit initially contains seven sigay (counters). The first move is played simultaneously by both players; after that, players alternate turns. The first player to finish their opening move may begin their second, though in face-to-face play a player may choose to delay slightly to observe and respond to their opponent's action — no rule prevents this. On their turn, a player empties one of their small pits and distributes its contents clockwise, one by one, into the subsequent pits, including their own store (but skipping the opponent's store). According to the National Historical Commission of the Philippines, the game may also be played counterclockwise, with each player owning the store to their right. Players must move whenever they can; if no move is available, the player passes until one becomes possible.

If the last stone falls into a non-empty small pit, the player picks up all the stones in that pit and continues distributing them. If the last stone drops into the player's own store, they earn a bonus move. If the last stone drops into an empty pit, the move ends (referred to as patay or "dead"). If the move ends in one of the player's own empty pits, they capture (taktak) the stones in the opponent's pit directly across the board, depositing them into their own store.

The game ends when no stones are left in the small pits. The player who captures the most stones wins. The game is often played in rounds; pits that cannot be filled with seven stones in subsequent rounds are considered sunog ("burnt" or closed), and leftover seeds are deposited in the owner's store. Play continues until a player can no longer fill even one pit.

== Other traditional games ==
=== Spirit of the Paper ===
Spirit of the Paper is a traditional Filipino children's divination game. It involves folding three pieces of paper containing hidden slips marked "yes", "no", and "maybe". While focusing on a question, the children chant a specific phrase three times and then select a slip to reveal the answer. Though regarded as a form of lighthearted fortune-telling, the game is part of a broader set of Filipino folk practices blending superstition and play.
