= 1901–02 collegiate men's basketball season in the United States =

American college basketball season

- Helms National Champions: Minnesota (retroactive selection in 1943)

The 1901–02 collegiate men's basketball season in the United States began in December 1901, progressed through the regular season, and concluded in March 1902.

== Rule changes ==
- An early form of dribbling became legal; previously, players were not allowed to bounce the ball at all and could advance it only by passing. The new dribbling rule did not permit continuous dribbling in the modern sense; instead, a player could bounce a ball only once and then recover it, and the bounce had to be higher than his head. A player was allowed to bounce and recover the ball in this way as many times in a row as he wanted or pass the ball to another player after any single-bounce dribble, but he was not allowed to shoot the ball after a dribble. The rule limited dribbling to a defensive tactic in which a player in effect passed the ball to himself. Continuous dribbling — dribbling in its modern sense — was not permitted until the 1909–10 season.

== Season headlines ==
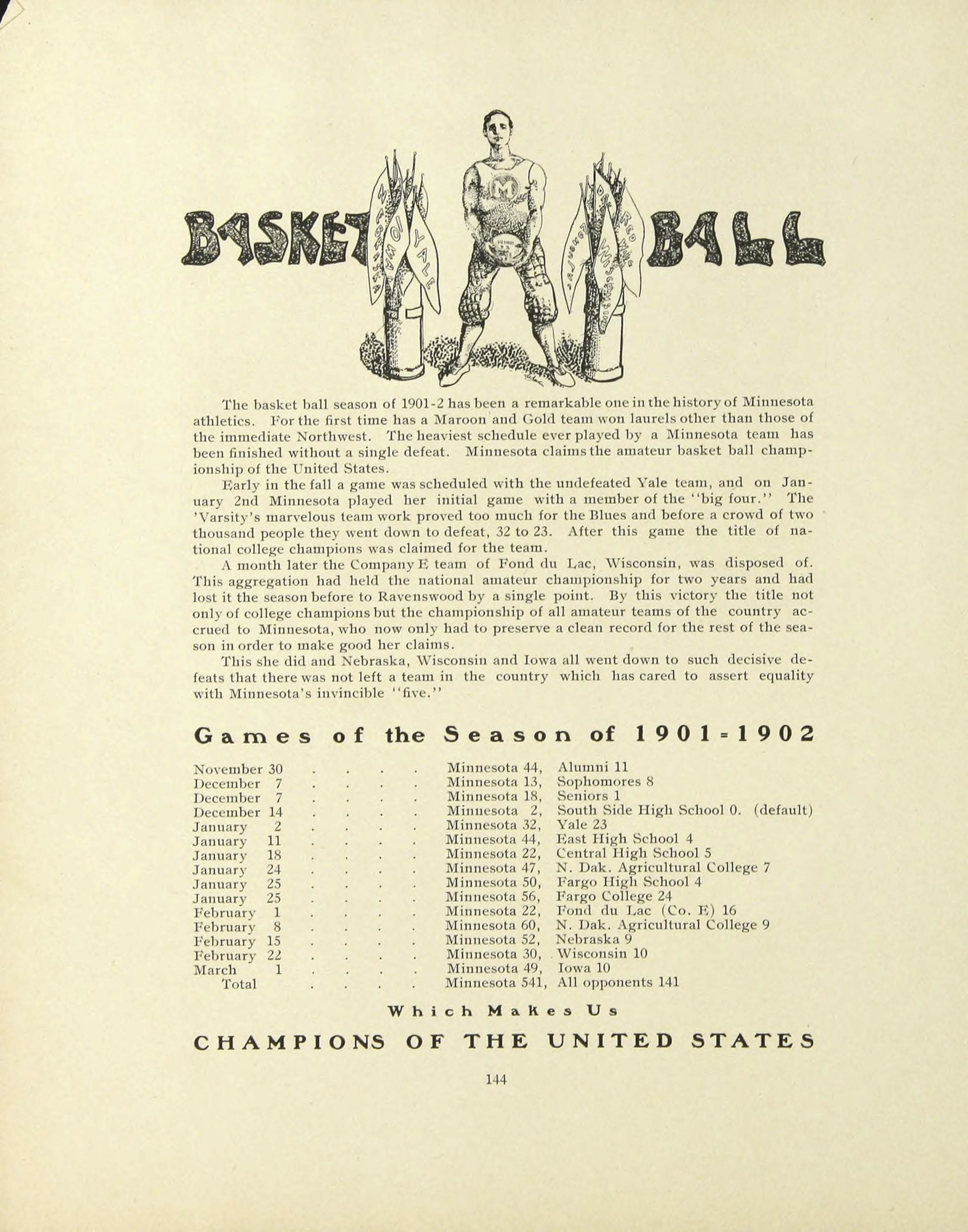
Minnesota claimed the national championship for the 1901–02 season in the pages of the 1903 edition of the university's yearbook The Gopher.

- The Eastern Intercollegiate Basketball League began play, with five original members. It played the first college conference basketball season.
- Minnesota went undefeated (15–0). Citing this unblemished record and a win over eastern champion Yale, Minnesota claimed the mythical national collegiate championship for the 1901–02 season. Minnesota also claimed that its win over the amateur champion Company E team of Fond du Lac, Wisconsin, entitled it to a mythical overall amateur basketball championship of the United States for the season.
- In February 1943, the Helms Athletic Foundation retroactively selected Minnesota as its national champion for the 1901–02 season.
- In 1995, the Premo-Porretta Power Poll retroactively selected Minnesota as its top-ranked team for the 1901–02 season.

== Conference membership changes ==
School	Former Conference	New Conference
Columbia Lions	Independent	Eastern Intercollegiate Basketball League
Cornell Big Red	Independent	Eastern Intercollegiate Basketball League
Harvard Crimson	Independent	Eastern Intercollegiate Basketball League
Iowa Hawkeyes	No major basketball program	Western Conference
Penn Quakers	No major basketball program	Independent
Princeton Tigers	Independent	Eastern Intercollegiate Basketball League
Yale Bulldogs	Independent	Eastern Intercollegiate Basketball League

== Regular season ==
=== Conferences ===
Conference	Regular Season Winner	Conference Player of the Year	Conference Tournament	Tournament Venue (City)	Tournament Winner
Eastern Intercollegiate Basketball League	Yale	None selected	No Tournament		
Western Conference	None (see note)	None selected	No Tournament		

NOTE: The Western Conference (the future Big Ten Conference) did not sponsor an official conference season or recognize a regular-season champion until the 1905–06 season, although a few intramural games took place within the conference during the 1901–02 season. Minnesota (15–0), Iowa (10–2), and Purdue (10–3) won 10 or more games.

1901–02 Eastern Intercollegiate Basketball League standings
	Conf.				Overall
Team	W		L	PCT	W		L	PCT
Yale	5	–	3	.625	13	–	8	.619
Harvard	4	–	4	.500	9	–	5	.643
Columbia	3	–	3	.500	5	–	3	.625
Princeton	4	–	4	.500	10	–	10	.500
Cornell	2	–	4	.333	5	–	5	.500

1901–02 Western Conference men's basketball standings
	Conf.				Overall
Team	W		L	PCT	W		L	PCT
Minnesota†*	2	–	0	1.000	15	–	0	1.000
Iowa		–		–	10	–	2	.833
Purdue	2	–	0	1.000	10	–	3	.769
Wisconsin	0	–	1	.000	7	–	3	.700
Indiana	0	–	2	.000	4	–	4	.500
† Intramural play only, the conference did not have an official championship *Minnesota was named Premo-Porretta and Helms Foundation National Champions winner

=== Independents ===
A total of 50 college teams played as major independents. Among them, St. Francis (NY) (13–1), Allegheny (13–1), Bucknell (12–2), Grove City (13–3), Mount Union (11–3), and Dartmouth (11–5) won more than 10 games.

1901–02 collegiate men's basketball independents standings
	Conf.				Overall
Team	W		L	PCT	W		L	PCT
Amherst		–		–	8	–	0	1.000
Colorado Agricultural		–		–	2	–	0	1.000
Michigan State		–		–	5	–	0	1.000
New Mexico		–		–	2	–	0	1.000
Ripon		–		–	4	–	0	1.000
Washington		–		–	7	–	0	1.000
Wisc.–Stevens Point		–		–	4	–	0	1.000
St. Francis (NY)		–		–	13	–	1	.929
Allegheny		–		–	12	–	1	.923
Bucknell		–		–	12	–	2	.857
St. Lawrence		–		–	6	–	1	.857
Penn State		–		–	9	–	2	.818
Grove City		–		–	13	–	3	.813
Mount Union		–		–	11	–	3	.786
Colgate		–		–	7	–	2	.778
Penn		–		–	7	–	2	.778
Williams		–		–	13	–	4	.765
Colorado		–		–	3	–	1	.750
Illinois State		–		–	3	–	1	.750
Temple		–		–	8	–	3	.727
Vanderbilt		–		–	5	–	2	.714
Wheaton (Ill.)		–		–	5	–	2	.714
Dartmouth		–		–	11	–	5	.688
Lehigh		–		–	9	–	5	.643
Geneva		–		–	7	–	4	.636
Hiram		–		–	7	–	4	.636
Nebraska		–		–	5	–	3	.625
North Dakota Agricultural		–		–	5	–	3	.625
Bloomsburg		–		–	4	–	3	.571
Cincinnati		–		–	5	–	4	.556
Akron		–		–	2	–	2	.500
Connecticut		–		–	5	–	5	.500
Grinnell		–		–	2	–	2	.500
Lafayette		–		–	5	–	5	.500
Syracuse		–		–	3	–	3	.500
Wooster		–		–	2	–	2	.500
Muhlenberg		–		–	5	–	6	.455
Holy Cross		–		–	4	–	5	.444
Wabash		–		–	4	–	5	.444
Rensselaer		–		–	3	–	4	.429
Kansas		–		–	5	–	7	.417
Westminster (Pa.)		–		–	3	–	5	.375
Augustana (Ill.)		–		–	1	–	2	.333
Oregon Agricultural		–		–	1	–	2	.333
Brown		–		–	5	–	15	.250
Butler		–		–	1	–	3	.250
Montana State		–		–	1	–	4	.200
Indiana State		–		–	1	–	6	.143
Washington State		–		–	0	–	2	.000
Wesleyan (Conn.)		–		–	0	–	4	.000
