= 1901–02 Holy Cross Crusaders men's basketball team =

American college basketball season

1901–02 Holy Cross Crusaders men's basketball
- Conference: Independent
- Record: 4–5
- Head coach: J. Fred Powers (1st season)
- Captain: John A. Quigley
- Home arena: Mechanics Hall

1901–02 collegiate men's basketball independents standings
	Conf.				Overall
Team	W		L	PCT	W		L	PCT
Amherst		–		–	8	–	0	1.000
Colorado Agricultural		–		–	2	–	0	1.000
Michigan State		–		–	5	–	0	1.000
New Mexico		–		–	2	–	0	1.000
Ripon		–		–	4	–	0	1.000
Washington		–		–	7	–	0	1.000
Wisc.–Stevens Point		–		–	4	–	0	1.000
St. Francis (NY)		–		–	13	–	1	.929
Allegheny		–		–	12	–	1	.923
Bucknell		–		–	12	–	2	.857
St. Lawrence		–		–	6	–	1	.857
Penn State		–		–	9	–	2	.818
Grove City		–		–	13	–	3	.813
Mount Union		–		–	11	–	3	.786
Colgate		–		–	7	–	2	.778
Penn		–		–	7	–	2	.778
Williams		–		–	13	–	4	.765
Colorado		–		–	3	–	1	.750
Illinois State		–		–	3	–	1	.750
Temple		–		–	8	–	3	.727
Vanderbilt		–		–	5	–	2	.714
Wheaton (Ill.)		–		–	5	–	2	.714
Dartmouth		–		–	11	–	5	.688
Lehigh		–		–	9	–	5	.643
Geneva		–		–	7	–	4	.636
Hiram		–		–	7	–	4	.636
Nebraska		–		–	5	–	3	.625
North Dakota Agricultural		–		–	5	–	3	.625
Bloomsburg		–		–	4	–	3	.571
Cincinnati		–		–	5	–	4	.556
Akron		–		–	2	–	2	.500
Connecticut		–		–	5	–	5	.500
Grinnell		–		–	2	–	2	.500
Lafayette		–		–	5	–	5	.500
Syracuse		–		–	3	–	3	.500
Wooster		–		–	2	–	2	.500
Muhlenberg		–		–	5	–	6	.455
Holy Cross		–		–	4	–	5	.444
Wabash		–		–	4	–	5	.444
Rensselaer		–		–	3	–	4	.429
Kansas		–		–	5	–	7	.417
Westminster (Pa.)		–		–	3	–	5	.375
Augustana (Ill.)		–		–	1	–	2	.333
Oregon Agricultural		–		–	1	–	2	.333
Brown		–		–	5	–	15	.250
Butler		–		–	1	–	3	.250
Montana State		–		–	1	–	4	.200
Indiana State		–		–	1	–	6	.143
Washington State		–		–	0	–	2	.000
Wesleyan (Conn.)		–		–	0	–	4	.000

The 1901–02 Holy Cross Crusaders men's basketball team represented The College of the Holy Cross during the 1901–02 college men's basketball season. The head coach was J. Fred Powers, coaching the Crusaders in his first season.

== Schedule ==
Date time, TV	Opponent	Result	Record	Site city, state
12/05/1901*	at Cambridgeport	L 21–37	0–1	
12/17/1901*	Dartmouth	W 25–18	1–1	Worcester, MA
1/18/1902*	at Brown	W 36–33	2–1	Providence, RI
1/21/1902*	Harvard	L 33–44	2–2	Worcester, MA
1/25/1902*	at Amherst	L 31–45	2–3	Amherst, MA
1/30/1902*	Brown	W 72–31	3–3	Mechanics Hall; Worcester, MA
2/08/1902*	at Dartmouth	L 27–78	3–4	Hanover, NH
2/15/1902*	at Trinity	L 17–37	3–5	Hartford, CT
2/26/1902*	Williams	W 28–17	4–5	Worcester, MA
*Non-conference game. (#) Tournament seedings in parentheses.
