= 1901–02 Kansas Jayhawks men's basketball team =

American college basketball season

1901–02 Kansas Jayhawks men's basketball
- Conference: Independent
- Record: 5–7
- Head coach: James Naismith (4th season)
- Captain: Chester Smith
- Home arena: Snow Hall

1901–02 collegiate men's basketball independents standings
	Conf.				Overall
Team	W		L	PCT	W		L	PCT
Amherst		–		–	8	–	0	1.000
Colorado Agricultural		–		–	2	–	0	1.000
Michigan State		–		–	5	–	0	1.000
New Mexico		–		–	2	–	0	1.000
Ripon		–		–	4	–	0	1.000
Washington		–		–	7	–	0	1.000
Wisc.–Stevens Point		–		–	4	–	0	1.000
St. Francis (NY)		–		–	13	–	1	.929
Allegheny		–		–	12	–	1	.923
Bucknell		–		–	12	–	2	.857
St. Lawrence		–		–	6	–	1	.857
Penn State		–		–	9	–	2	.818
Grove City		–		–	13	–	3	.813
Mount Union		–		–	11	–	3	.786
Colgate		–		–	7	–	2	.778
Penn		–		–	7	–	2	.778
Williams		–		–	13	–	4	.765
Colorado		–		–	3	–	1	.750
Illinois State		–		–	3	–	1	.750
Temple		–		–	8	–	3	.727
Vanderbilt		–		–	5	–	2	.714
Wheaton (Ill.)		–		–	5	–	2	.714
Dartmouth		–		–	11	–	5	.688
Lehigh		–		–	9	–	5	.643
Geneva		–		–	7	–	4	.636
Hiram		–		–	7	–	4	.636
Nebraska		–		–	5	–	3	.625
North Dakota Agricultural		–		–	5	–	3	.625
Bloomsburg		–		–	4	–	3	.571
Cincinnati		–		–	5	–	4	.556
Akron		–		–	2	–	2	.500
Connecticut		–		–	5	–	5	.500
Grinnell		–		–	2	–	2	.500
Lafayette		–		–	5	–	5	.500
Syracuse		–		–	3	–	3	.500
Wooster		–		–	2	–	2	.500
Muhlenberg		–		–	5	–	6	.455
Holy Cross		–		–	4	–	5	.444
Wabash		–		–	4	–	5	.444
Rensselaer		–		–	3	–	4	.429
Kansas		–		–	5	–	7	.417
Westminster (Pa.)		–		–	3	–	5	.375
Augustana (Ill.)		–		–	1	–	2	.333
Oregon Agricultural		–		–	1	–	2	.333
Brown		–		–	5	–	15	.250
Butler		–		–	1	–	3	.250
Montana State		–		–	1	–	4	.200
Indiana State		–		–	1	–	6	.143
Washington State		–		–	0	–	2	.000
Wesleyan (Conn.)		–		–	0	–	4	.000

The 1901–02 Kansas Jayhawks men's basketball team represented the University of Kansas in its fourth season of collegiate basketball. The Jayhawks were led by 4th year head coach James Naismith. The Jayhawks finished the season 5–7.

== Roster ==
- Joseph Alford
- Donald Alford
- Harry Allen
- Clyde Allphin
- Paul Atkinson
- Charles Fees
- Albert Hicks
- Charles Jennings
- Frederick Owens
- Arthur Pooler
- Chester Smith
- John Tolan

== Schedule ==
Date time, TV	Opponent	Result	Record	Site city, state
Dec. 9, 1901*	Haskell	L 19–31	0–1	Lawrence, Kansas
Dec. 15, 1901* no	Ottawa (KS)	L 21–25	0–2	Lawrence, Kansas
Jan. 15, 1902*	at Haskell	W 27–22	1–2	Lawrence, Kansas
Jan. 24, 1902*	William Jewell	W 12–11	2–2	Lawrence, Kansas
Feb. 3, 1902*	at Des Moines YMCA	W 38–23	3–2	Des Moines, Iowa
Feb. 4, 1902*	at Muscatine YMCA	L 23–40	3–3	Muscatine, Iowa
Feb. 5, 1902*	at Iowa	L 27–40	3–4	Iowa City, Iowa
Feb. 6, 1902* no	at Fairfield Co. M	L 17–33	3–5	Fairfield, Iowa
Feb. 7, 1902*	at Ottumwa	L 15–20	3–6	Ottumwa, Iowa
Feb. 8, 1902*	at William Jewell	W 19–16	4–6	Liberty, Missouri
Mar. 1, 1902*	Nebraska	L 29–35	4–7	Lawrence, Kansas
Mar. 14, 1902*	at Leavenworth YMCA	W 36–7	5–7	Leavenworth, Kansas
*Non-conference game. ^{#}Rankings from AP Poll. (#) Tournament seedings in parentheses. All times are in Central Standard Time.
