= 1901–02 Nebraska Cornhuskers men's basketball team =

American college basketball season

1901–02 Nebraska Cornhuskers men's basketball
- Conference: Independent
- Record: 5–3
- Head coach: Fred Morrall (1st season)
- Home arena: Grant Memorial Hall

1901–02 collegiate men's basketball independents standings
	Conf.				Overall
Team	W		L	PCT	W		L	PCT
Amherst		–		–	8	–	0	1.000
Colorado Agricultural		–		–	2	–	0	1.000
Michigan State		–		–	5	–	0	1.000
New Mexico		–		–	2	–	0	1.000
Ripon		–		–	4	–	0	1.000
Washington		–		–	7	–	0	1.000
Wisc.–Stevens Point		–		–	4	–	0	1.000
St. Francis (NY)		–		–	13	–	1	.929
Allegheny		–		–	12	–	1	.923
Bucknell		–		–	12	–	2	.857
St. Lawrence		–		–	6	–	1	.857
Penn State		–		–	9	–	2	.818
Grove City		–		–	13	–	3	.813
Mount Union		–		–	11	–	3	.786
Colgate		–		–	7	–	2	.778
Penn		–		–	7	–	2	.778
Williams		–		–	13	–	4	.765
Colorado		–		–	3	–	1	.750
Illinois State		–		–	3	–	1	.750
Temple		–		–	8	–	3	.727
Vanderbilt		–		–	5	–	2	.714
Wheaton (Ill.)		–		–	5	–	2	.714
Dartmouth		–		–	11	–	5	.688
Lehigh		–		–	9	–	5	.643
Geneva		–		–	7	–	4	.636
Hiram		–		–	7	–	4	.636
Nebraska		–		–	5	–	3	.625
North Dakota Agricultural		–		–	5	–	3	.625
Bloomsburg		–		–	4	–	3	.571
Cincinnati		–		–	5	–	4	.556
Akron		–		–	2	–	2	.500
Connecticut		–		–	5	–	5	.500
Grinnell		–		–	2	–	2	.500
Lafayette		–		–	5	–	5	.500
Syracuse		–		–	3	–	3	.500
Wooster		–		–	2	–	2	.500
Muhlenberg		–		–	5	–	6	.455
Holy Cross		–		–	4	–	5	.444
Wabash		–		–	4	–	5	.444
Rensselaer		–		–	3	–	4	.429
Kansas		–		–	5	–	7	.417
Westminster (Pa.)		–		–	3	–	5	.375
Augustana (Ill.)		–		–	1	–	2	.333
Oregon Agricultural		–		–	1	–	2	.333
Brown		–		–	5	–	15	.250
Butler		–		–	1	–	3	.250
Montana State		–		–	1	–	4	.200
Indiana State		–		–	1	–	6	.143
Washington State		–		–	0	–	2	.000
Wesleyan (Conn.)		–		–	0	–	4	.000

The 1901–02 Nebraska Cornhuskers men's basketball team represented the University of Nebraska as an independent in the 1901–02 collegiate men's basketball season. The team was led by first-year head coach Fred Morrall and played home games at Grant Memorial Hall in Lincoln, Nebraska.

== Schedule ==
Date time, TV	Opponent	Result	Record	Site city, state
January 18, 1902	Nebraska	W 63–14	1–0	Grant Memorial Hall; Lincoln, NE
February 1, 1902	Lincoln YMCA	W 32–30	2–0	Grant Memorial Hall; Lincoln, NE
February 15, 1902	at Minnesota	L 52–9	2–1	UM Armory; Minneapolis, MN
February 17, 1902	at Sioux City YMCA	W 42–24	3–1	
February 28, 1902	at Haskell	L 79–29	3–2	
March 1, 1902	at Kansas	W 35–29	4–2	Snow Hall; Lawrence, KS
March 3, 1902	at Topeka YMCA	L 52–36	4–3	
March 22, 1902	Topeka YMCA	W 27–13	5–3	Grant Memorial Hall; Lincoln, NE
*Non-conference game. (#) Tournament seedings in parentheses.
