= List of Notre Dame Fighting Irish men's basketball head coaches =

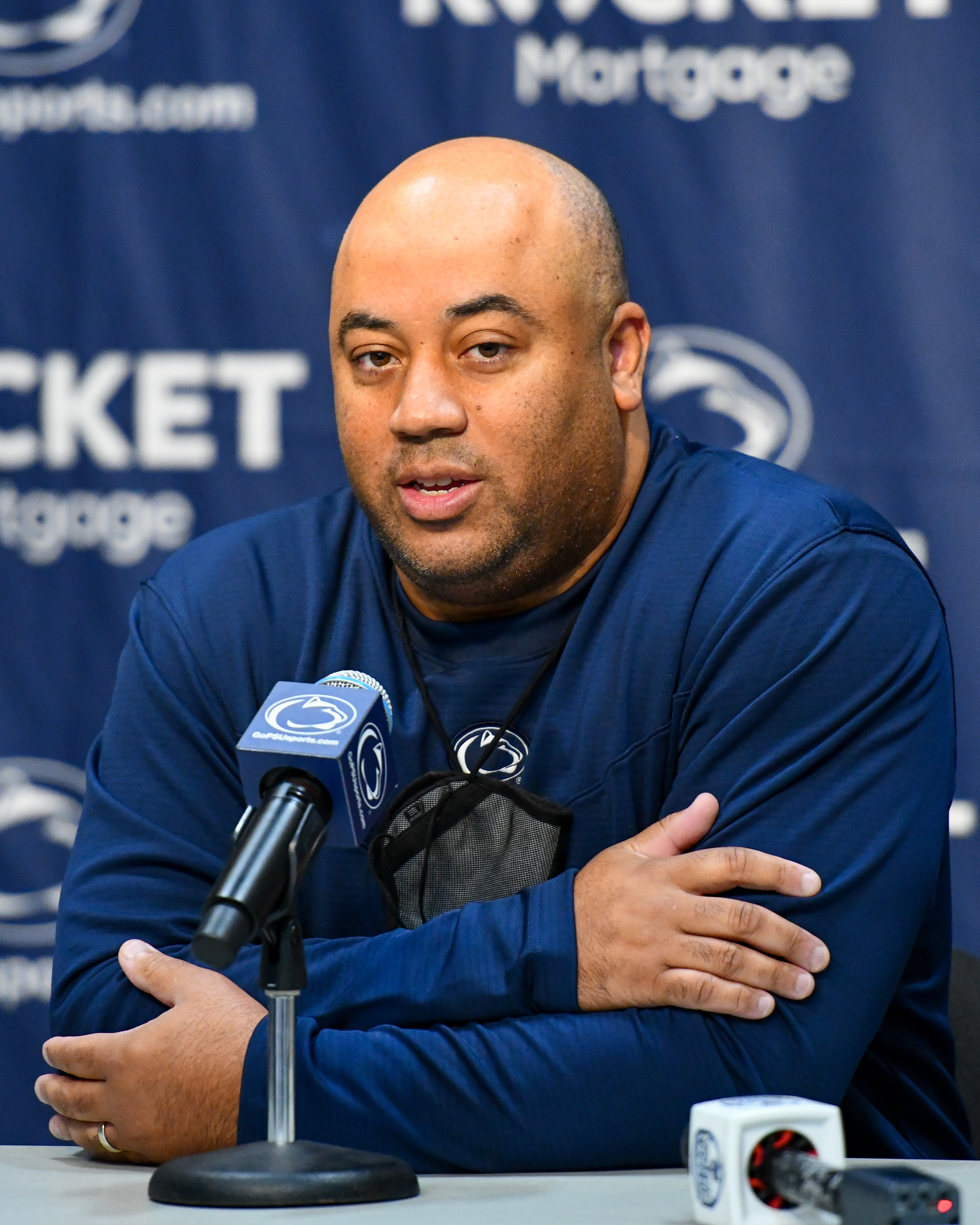
Micah Shrewsberry, the current head coach of the Notre Dame Fighting Irish.

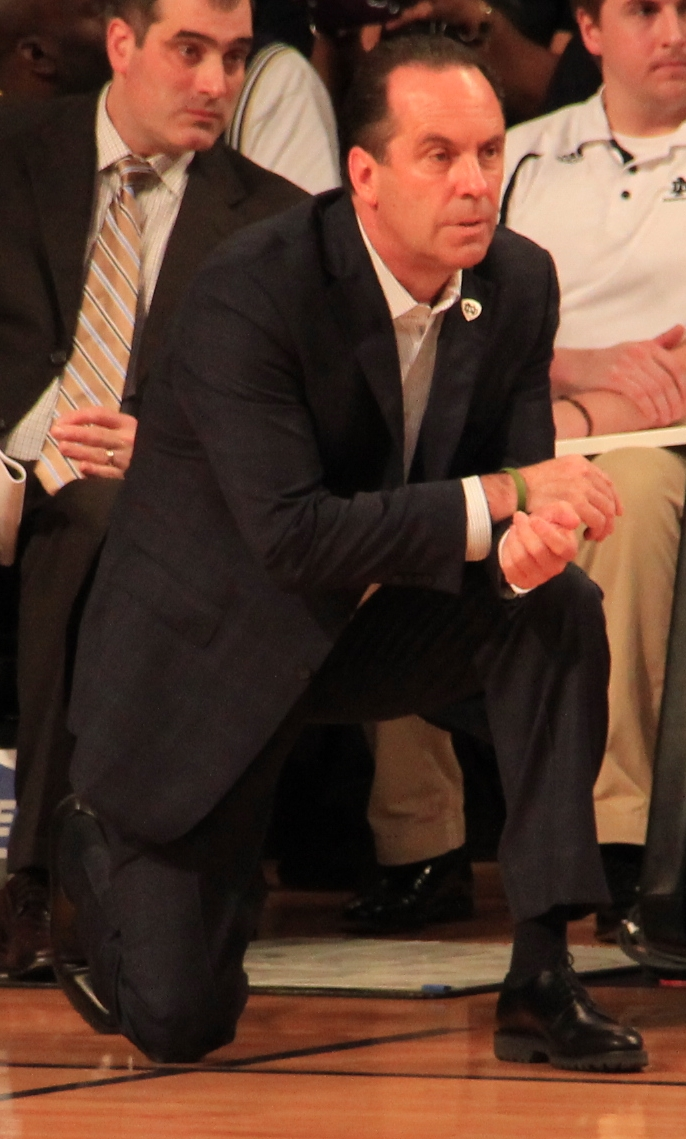
Mike Brey, the winningest head coach in Fighting Irish men's basketball history.

The following is a list of Notre Dame Fighting Irish men's basketball head coaches. There have been 18 head coaches of the Fighting Irish in their 120-season history.

Notre Dame's current head coach is Micah Shrewsberry. He was hired as the Fighting Irish's head coach in March 2023, replacing Mike Brey, who stepped down after the 2022–23 season.

No.	Tenure	Coach	Years	Record	Pct.
–	1896–1897; 1901–1902	No coach	2	4–2–1	.643
1	1897–1898	Frank E. Hering	1	1–2	.333
2	1898–1899	J. Fred Powers	1	2–0	1.000
3	1907–1912	Bertram Maris	5	78–20	.796
4	1912–1913	Bill Nelson	1	13–2	.867
5	1913–1919	Jesse Harper	6	46–30	.605
6	1919–1920	Gus Dorais	1	5–13	.278
7	1920–1923	Walter Halas	3	25–39	.391
8	1923–1943 (Note: Keogan died on February 17, 1943. Moose Krause replaced him on a permanent basis for the rest of the 1942–43 season.)	George Keogan	20	327–97–1	.771
9	1943–1944; 1946–1951	Moose Krause	7	87–48	.644
10	1944–1945	Clem Crowe	1	15–5	.750
11	1945–1946	Elmer Ripley	1	17–4	.810
12	1951–1964	John Jordan	13	199–131	.603
13	1964–1971	John Dee	7	116–80	.592
14	1971–1991	Digger Phelps	20	393–197	.666
15	1991–1999	John MacLeod	8	106–124	.461
16	1999–2000	Matt Doherty	1	22–15	.595
17	2000–2023	Mike Brey	23	483–280	.633
18	2023–present	Micah Shrewsberry	3	41–56	.423
Totals		18 coaches	122 seasons	1,989–1,114–1	.641
Records updated through end of 2025–26 season Source
