= Phelps Darby =

American basketball player and coach (1881–1957)

Biographical details
- Born: October 17, 1881; Evansville, Indiana, U.S.
- Died: April 23, 1957 (aged 75); Evansville, Indiana, U.S.
- Education: Indiana

Coaching career (HC unless noted)

Basketball
- 1901–1902: Indiana

Head coaching record
- Overall: 4–4 (basketball)

Phelps Franklin Darby (October 17, 1881 – April 23, 1957) was a player and coach of Indiana Hoosiers men's basketball team in 1902.

== Indiana player–coach ==
During the early 1900s, Darby was the basketball coach at Indiana.

== Indiana Athletes Association ==
Phelps Darby led the Indiana Athletes Association when it was established.

== Head coaching record ==
Record table
Season	Team	Overall	Conference	Standing	Postseason
Indiana Hoosiers (Independent) (1902)
1901–02	Indiana	4–4			
Indiana:		4–4			
Total:		4–4			
