= 1901–02 Bucknell Bison men's basketball team =

American college basketball season

1901–02 Bucknell Bison men's basketball
- Conference: Independent
- Record: 12–2
- Head coach: Student coaches
- Home arena: none

1901–02 collegiate men's basketball independents standings
	Conf.				Overall
Team	W		L	PCT	W		L	PCT
Amherst		–		–	8	–	0	1.000
Colorado Agricultural		–		–	2	–	0	1.000
Michigan State		–		–	5	–	0	1.000
New Mexico		–		–	2	–	0	1.000
Ripon		–		–	4	–	0	1.000
Washington		–		–	7	–	0	1.000
Wisc.–Stevens Point		–		–	4	–	0	1.000
St. Francis (NY)		–		–	13	–	1	.929
Allegheny		–		–	12	–	1	.923
Bucknell		–		–	12	–	2	.857
St. Lawrence		–		–	6	–	1	.857
Penn State		–		–	9	–	2	.818
Grove City		–		–	13	–	3	.813
Mount Union		–		–	11	–	3	.786
Colgate		–		–	7	–	2	.778
Penn		–		–	7	–	2	.778
Williams		–		–	13	–	4	.765
Colorado		–		–	3	–	1	.750
Illinois State		–		–	3	–	1	.750
Temple		–		–	8	–	3	.727
Vanderbilt		–		–	5	–	2	.714
Wheaton (Ill.)		–		–	5	–	2	.714
Dartmouth		–		–	11	–	5	.688
Lehigh		–		–	9	–	5	.643
Geneva		–		–	7	–	4	.636
Hiram		–		–	7	–	4	.636
Nebraska		–		–	5	–	3	.625
North Dakota Agricultural		–		–	5	–	3	.625
Bloomsburg		–		–	4	–	3	.571
Cincinnati		–		–	5	–	4	.556
Akron		–		–	2	–	2	.500
Connecticut		–		–	5	–	5	.500
Grinnell		–		–	2	–	2	.500
Lafayette		–		–	5	–	5	.500
Syracuse		–		–	3	–	3	.500
Wooster		–		–	2	–	2	.500
Muhlenberg		–		–	5	–	6	.455
Holy Cross		–		–	4	–	5	.444
Wabash		–		–	4	–	5	.444
Rensselaer		–		–	3	–	4	.429
Kansas		–		–	5	–	7	.417
Westminster (Pa.)		–		–	3	–	5	.375
Augustana (Ill.)		–		–	1	–	2	.333
Oregon Agricultural		–		–	1	–	2	.333
Brown		–		–	5	–	15	.250
Butler		–		–	1	–	3	.250
Montana State		–		–	1	–	4	.200
Indiana State		–		–	1	–	6	.143
Washington State		–		–	0	–	2	.000
Wesleyan (Conn.)		–		–	0	–	4	.000

The 1901–02 Bucknell Bison men's basketball team represented Bucknell University during the 1901–02 collegiate men's basketball season. The team finished the season with an overall record of 12–2.

== Schedule ==
Date time, TV	Opponent	Result	Record	Site city, state
1/11/1902*	Lock Haven	W 46–8	1–0	Lewisburg, PA
1/17/1902*	Gettysburg	W 38–7	2–0	Lewisburg, PA
1/24/1902*	at Gettysburg	W 30–24	3–0	Gettysburg, PA
1/25/1902*	at Dickinson	W 21–13	4–0	Carlisle, PA
1/31/1902*	Dickinson	W 46–3	5–0	Lewisburg, PA
2/11/1902*	Muhlenberg	W 29–9	6–0	Lewisburg, PA
2/12/1902*	Princeton Tigers men's basketball	W 20–13	6–1	Princeton, NJ
2/13/1902*	Lehigh	W 64–19	7–2	Bethlehem, PA
2/22/1902*	Lehigh	W 68–3	8–2	Lewisburg, PA
2/27/1902*	at Lock Haven	W 44–6	9–2	Lock Haven, PA
2/28/1902*	at Allegheny	L 4–26	10–2	Pittsburgh, PA
3/1/1902*	at Warren	W 38–34	11–2	
3/12/1902*	Pittston	W 30–9	12–2	Lewisburg, PA
*Non-conference game. (#) Tournament seedings in parentheses.
