= 1901–02 Penn State Nittany Lions basketball team =

American college basketball season

1901–02 Penn State Nittany Lions men's basketball
- Conference: Independent
- Record: 9–2
- Head coach: student coaches
- Captain: C.W. Ruble
- Home arena: Armory

1901–02 collegiate men's basketball independents standings
	Conf.				Overall
Team	W		L	PCT	W		L	PCT
Amherst		–		–	8	–	0	1.000
Colorado Agricultural		–		–	2	–	0	1.000
Michigan State		–		–	5	–	0	1.000
New Mexico		–		–	2	–	0	1.000
Ripon		–		–	4	–	0	1.000
Washington		–		–	7	–	0	1.000
Wisc.–Stevens Point		–		–	4	–	0	1.000
St. Francis (NY)		–		–	13	–	1	.929
Allegheny		–		–	12	–	1	.923
Bucknell		–		–	12	–	2	.857
St. Lawrence		–		–	6	–	1	.857
Penn State		–		–	9	–	2	.818
Grove City		–		–	13	–	3	.813
Mount Union		–		–	11	–	3	.786
Colgate		–		–	7	–	2	.778
Penn		–		–	7	–	2	.778
Williams		–		–	13	–	4	.765
Colorado		–		–	3	–	1	.750
Illinois State		–		–	3	–	1	.750
Temple		–		–	8	–	3	.727
Vanderbilt		–		–	5	–	2	.714
Wheaton (Ill.)		–		–	5	–	2	.714
Dartmouth		–		–	11	–	5	.688
Lehigh		–		–	9	–	5	.643
Geneva		–		–	7	–	4	.636
Hiram		–		–	7	–	4	.636
Nebraska		–		–	5	–	3	.625
North Dakota Agricultural		–		–	5	–	3	.625
Bloomsburg		–		–	4	–	3	.571
Cincinnati		–		–	5	–	4	.556
Akron		–		–	2	–	2	.500
Connecticut		–		–	5	–	5	.500
Grinnell		–		–	2	–	2	.500
Lafayette		–		–	5	–	5	.500
Syracuse		–		–	3	–	3	.500
Wooster		–		–	2	–	2	.500
Muhlenberg		–		–	5	–	6	.455
Holy Cross		–		–	4	–	5	.444
Wabash		–		–	4	–	5	.444
Rensselaer		–		–	3	–	4	.429
Kansas		–		–	5	–	7	.417
Westminster (Pa.)		–		–	3	–	5	.375
Augustana (Ill.)		–		–	1	–	2	.333
Oregon Agricultural		–		–	1	–	2	.333
Brown		–		–	5	–	15	.250
Butler		–		–	1	–	3	.250
Montana State		–		–	1	–	4	.200
Indiana State		–		–	1	–	6	.143
Washington State		–		–	0	–	2	.000
Wesleyan (Conn.)		–		–	0	–	4	.000

The 1901–02 Penn State Nittany Lions basketball team represented Penn State University during the 1901–02 college men's basketball season. The team finished with a final record of 9–2.

== Schedule ==
Date time, TV	Opponent	Result	Record	Site city, state
1/17/1902*	Lock Haven	W 43–13	1–0	Armory; University Park, PA
1/31/1902*	Bloomsburg	W 53–4	2–0	Armory; University Park, PA
2/7/1902*	Pennsylvania	W 52–17	3–0	Armory; University Park, PA
2/14/1902*	Pittston YMCA	W 53–13	4–0	Armory; University Park, PA
2/21/1902*	Lehigh	W 39–24	5–0	Armory; University Park, PA
2/25/1902*	at Lehigh	L 22–24	5–1	Bethlehem, PA
2/26/1902*	at Bloomsburg	L 28–44	5–2	Bloomsburg, PA
2/27/1902*	at Williamsport YMCA	W 19–9	6–2	
2/28/1902*	at Lock Haven	W 21–16	7–2	
3/1/1902*	Company B, 5th Regiment	W 58–2	8–2	Armory; University Park, PA
3/7/1902*	Williamsport YMCA	W 17–12	9–2	Armory; University Park, PA
*Non-conference game. (#) Tournament seedings in parentheses.
