= 1901–02 Indiana State Sycamores men's basketball team =

American college basketball season

1901–02 Indiana State Sycamores men's basketball
- Conference: Independent
- Record: 1–6
- Head coach: John Kimmell (3rd season)
- Home arena: North Hall

1901–02 collegiate men's basketball independents standings
	Conf.				Overall
Team	W		L	PCT	W		L	PCT
Amherst		–		–	8	–	0	1.000
Colorado Agricultural		–		–	2	–	0	1.000
Michigan State		–		–	5	–	0	1.000
New Mexico		–		–	2	–	0	1.000
Ripon		–		–	4	–	0	1.000
Washington		–		–	7	–	0	1.000
Wisc.–Stevens Point		–		–	4	–	0	1.000
St. Francis (NY)		–		–	13	–	1	.929
Allegheny		–		–	12	–	1	.923
Bucknell		–		–	12	–	2	.857
St. Lawrence		–		–	6	–	1	.857
Penn State		–		–	9	–	2	.818
Grove City		–		–	13	–	3	.813
Mount Union		–		–	11	–	3	.786
Colgate		–		–	7	–	2	.778
Penn		–		–	7	–	2	.778
Williams		–		–	13	–	4	.765
Colorado		–		–	3	–	1	.750
Illinois State		–		–	3	–	1	.750
Temple		–		–	8	–	3	.727
Vanderbilt		–		–	5	–	2	.714
Wheaton (Ill.)		–		–	5	–	2	.714
Dartmouth		–		–	11	–	5	.688
Lehigh		–		–	9	–	5	.643
Geneva		–		–	7	–	4	.636
Hiram		–		–	7	–	4	.636
Nebraska		–		–	5	–	3	.625
North Dakota Agricultural		–		–	5	–	3	.625
Bloomsburg		–		–	4	–	3	.571
Cincinnati		–		–	5	–	4	.556
Akron		–		–	2	–	2	.500
Connecticut		–		–	5	–	5	.500
Grinnell		–		–	2	–	2	.500
Lafayette		–		–	5	–	5	.500
Syracuse		–		–	3	–	3	.500
Wooster		–		–	2	–	2	.500
Muhlenberg		–		–	5	–	6	.455
Holy Cross		–		–	4	–	5	.444
Wabash		–		–	4	–	5	.444
Rensselaer		–		–	3	–	4	.429
Kansas		–		–	5	–	7	.417
Westminster (Pa.)		–		–	3	–	5	.375
Augustana (Ill.)		–		–	1	–	2	.333
Oregon Agricultural		–		–	1	–	2	.333
Brown		–		–	5	–	15	.250
Butler		–		–	1	–	3	.250
Montana State		–		–	1	–	4	.200
Indiana State		–		–	1	–	6	.143
Washington State		–		–	0	–	2	.000
Wesleyan (Conn.)		–		–	0	–	4	.000

The 1901–02 Indiana State Sycamores men's basketball team represented Indiana State University during the 1901–02 collegiate men's basketball season. The head coach was John Kimmell, in his third season coaching the Sycamores. The team played their home games at North Hall in Terre Haute, Indiana.

== Schedule ==
Date time, TV	Opponent	Result	Record	Site city, state
1/16/1902	at YMCA Paris, Ill.	W 25–11	1–0	
1/24/1902	Indiana	L 13–21	1–1	North Hall; Terre Haute, IN
1/25/1902	at Manual Training H.S.	L 06–50	1–2	
2/07/1902	at Purdue	L 17–39	1–3	Lafayette Coliseum; West Lafayette, IN
2/28/1902	at Indiana	L 14–25	1–4	Old Assembly Hall; Bloomington, IN
3/07/1902	Manual Train H.S.	L 11–16	1–5	North Hall; Terre Haute, IN
3/20/1901	YMCA Terre Haute	L 17–20	1–6	North Hall; Terre Haute, IN
*Non-conference game. (#) Tournament seedings in parentheses.
