= 1901–02 Wisconsin Badgers men's basketball team =

American college basketball season

1901–02 Wisconsin Badgers men's basketball
- Conference: Big Ten Conference
- Record: 7–3 (0–1 Western)
- Head coach: James C. Elsom
- Home arena: Red Gym

1901–02 Western Conference men's basketball standings
	Conf.				Overall
Team	W		L	PCT	W		L	PCT
Minnesota†*	2	–	0	1.000	15	–	0	1.000
Iowa		–		–	10	–	2	.833
Purdue	2	–	0	1.000	10	–	3	.769
Wisconsin	0	–	1	.000	7	–	3	.700
Indiana	0	–	2	.000	4	–	4	.500
† Intramural play only, the conference did not have an official championship *Minnesota was named Premo-Porretta and Helms Foundation National Champions winner

The 1901–02 Wisconsin Badgers men's basketball team represented University of Wisconsin–Madison. The head coach was James C. Elsom, his fourth season with the Badgers. The team played their home games at the Red Gym in Madison, Wisconsin and was a member of the Western Conference.

== Schedule ==
Date time, TV	Rank^{#}	Opponent^{#}	Result	Record	Site city, state
Regular Season
12/13/1901*		at Lewis Institute	W 32–21	1–0	Chicago, IL
12/14/1901*		at Armour Institute	W 20–14	2–0	Chicago, IL
12/27/1901*		at Milwaukee Normals	W 37–18	3–0	Milwaukee, WI
1/01/1902*		vs. Yale	L 20–35	3–1	Milwaukee, WI
1/04/1902*		at Milwaukee Normals Alumni	W 41–12	4–1	Milwaukee, WI
1/11/1902*		at La Crosse YMCA	W 59–16	5–1	La Crosse, WI
1/25/1902*		at Lawrence (WI)	W 51–20	6–1	Appleton, WI
2/15/1902*		at Sun Prairie	W 18–9	7–1	Sun Prairie, WI
2/22/1902		at Minnesota	L 10–30	7–2 (0–1)	Minnesota Armory; Minneapolis, MN
3/07/1902*		at Ripon (WI)	L 21–28	7–3 (0–1)	Ripon, WI
*Non-conference game. ^{#}Rankings from AP Poll. (#) Tournament seedings in parentheses.
