= 1901–02 Cornell Big Red men's basketball team =

American college basketball season

1901–02 Cornell Big Red men's basketball
- Conference: Eastern Intercollegiate Basketball League
- Record: 5–5 (2–4 EIBL)
- Head coach: none
- Captain: William F. Steele
- Home arena: none

The 1901–02 Cornell Big Red men's basketball team represented Cornell University during the 1901–02 college men's basketball season. The team captain William Steele.

== Schedule ==
Date time, TV	Opponent	Result	Record	Site city, state
1/13/1902*	Waverly YMCA	W 37–28	1–0	Ithaca, NY
1/17/1902	at Princeton	L 14–35	1–1 (0–1)	University Gymnasium; New Brunswick, NJ
1/18/1902	at Harvard	W 34–26	2–1 (1–1)	Cambridge, MA
1/24/1902	Harvard	L 20–26	2–2 (1–2)	Ithaca, NY
2/14/1902	at Yale	L 16–42	2–3 (1–3)	New Haven, CT
2/15/1901	at Williams	L 14–18	2–4	Williamstown, MA
3/3/1902*	Yale	W 24–14	3–4 (2–3)	Ithaca, NY
3/7/1902*	at Colgate	W 39–29	4–4	Hamilton, NY
3/8/1902*	at Hamilton	W 27–16	5–4	Hamilton, NY
3/16/1902*	at Princeton	T 12–12	5–5 (2–4)	Ithaca, NY
*Non-conference game. (#) Tournament seedings in parentheses.
