= 1901–02 Indiana Hoosiers men's basketball team =

American college basketball season

1901–02 Indiana Hoosiers men's basketball
- Conference: Independent
- Record: 4–4
- Head coach: Phelps Darby (1st season)
- Captain: Phelps Darby
- Home arena: Old Assembly Hall

1901–02 Western Conference men's basketball standings
| | Conf. | | | | Overall |
| Team | W | | L | PCT | W | | L | PCT |
|---|---|---|---|---|---|---|---|---|
| Minnesota†* | 2 | – | 0 | 1.000 | 15 | – | 0 | 1.000 |
| Iowa | | – | | – | 10 | – | 2 | .833 |
| Purdue | 2 | – | 0 | 1.000 | 10 | – | 3 | .769 |
| Wisconsin | 0 | – | 1 | .000 | 7 | – | 3 | .700 |
| Indiana | 0 | – | 2 | .000 | 4 | – | 4 | .500 |
† Intramural play only, the conference did not have an official championship *Minnesota was named Premo-Porretta and Helms Foundation National Champions winner

The 1901–02 Indiana Hoosiers men's basketball team was 2nd season represented Indiana University. Their head coach was Phelps Darby, who also served as the team captain, and was in his first and only year. The team played its home games at the Old Assembly Hall in Bloomington, Indiana.

The Hoosiers finished the regular season with an overall record of 4–4.

== Roster ==
| Name | Position | Year | Hometown |
|---|---|---|---|
| Harry Ayers | G | Jr. | Hartford City, Indiana |
| Guy Cantwell | G | Jr. | Spencer, Indiana |
| Charles Carr | F | Fr. | Anderson, Indiana |
| Willis Coval | F | So. | Indianapolis, Indiana |
| Phelps Darby | C/F | Sr. | Evansville, Indiana |
| Clyde Dreisbach | F | Jr. | Fort Wayne, Indiana |
| Edmund Elfers | G | Sr. | Rising Sun, Indiana |
| Thomas Harrison | F | Sr. | Evansville, Indiana |
| Alvah Rucker | G | Sr. | Evansville, Indiana |
| Roy Shackleton | G | So. | Chatterton, Indiana |
| William Stone | F | Jr. | Spencer, Indiana |
| Charles Unnewehr | F/C | Sr. | Batesville, Indiana |
| Marvin Wallace | G | So. | Milton, Indiana |

== Schedule ==
| Date time, TV | Rank^{#} | Opponent^{#} | Result | Record | Site city, state |
Regular season
| 1/15/1902* | | Butler | L 15–17 | 0–1 | Old Assembly Hall; Bloomington, IN |
| 1/24/1902* | | at Indiana State | W 21–13 | 1–1 | North Hall; Terre Haute, IN |
| 1/24/1902* | | at Rose Poly | L 16–23 | 1–2 | Terre Haute, IN |
| 2/1/1902* | | vs. Wabash | W 26–23 | 2–2 | Indianapolis, IN |
| 2/15/1902* | | Purdue; Rivalry | L 8–32 | 2–3 | Old Assembly Hall; Bloomington, IN |
| 2/25/1902* | | at Butler | W 32–29 | 3–3 | Indianapolis, IN |
| 2/28/1902* | | Indiana State | W 25–14 | 4–3 | Old Assembly Hall; Bloomington, IN |
| 3/7/1902* | | at Purdue; Rivalry | L 25–71 | 4–4 | Lafayette Coliseum; West Lafayette, IN |
*Non-conference game. ^{#}Rankings from AP Poll. (#) Tournament seedings in parentheses.
