= 1901–02 Purdue Boilermakers men's basketball team =

American college basketball season

1901–02 Purdue Boilermakers men's basketball
- Conference: Western Conference
- Record: 10–3 (2–0 Western)
- Head coach: C.M. Best (1st season)
- Captain: H. Wallace Reimann
- Home arena: Lafayette Coliseum

1901–02 Western Conference men's basketball standings
	Conf.				Overall
Team	W		L	PCT	W		L	PCT
Minnesota†*	2	–	0	1.000	15	–	0	1.000
Iowa		–		–	10	–	2	.833
Purdue	2	–	0	1.000	10	–	3	.769
Wisconsin	0	–	1	.000	7	–	3	.700
Indiana	0	–	2	.000	4	–	4	.500
† Intramural play only, the conference did not have an official championship *Minnesota was named Premo-Porretta and Helms Foundation National Champions winner

The 1901–02 Purdue Boilermakers men's basketball team compiled a 10–3 record, led by returning team captain Wallace Reimann. The team averaged 39 points per game and held their opponents to 18.9 points per game. By sweeping their Indiana opponents of Butler, Indiana, and Indiana State Normal, they claimed the state championship for the second year in a row. Two particular features of this season were an extended road trip through the South, and a game against Yale. Starting forward Harry Cook died mid-season on February 27, 1902.

== Roster ==
Player	Position	Class
H. Wallace Reimann	Forward	Jr.
Harry W. Cook	Forward	Jr.
John F. G. Miller	Center	Jr.
D. Ralph Lucas	Guard	Soph.
C. L. Peck	Guard	
Joseph B. Knapp	Sub. Guard	
C. Conroy	Sub. Guard	
W. N. Moore	Sub. Guard	
Simeon V. B. Miller	Sub. Guard	Fr.
A. G. Caldwell	Sub. Forward	
J. H. Collier	Sub. Forward	

== Games ==
Date time, TV	Opponent	Result	Record	Site city, state
December 18, 1901	at Nashville Athletic Association	W 30–6	1–0	Nashville, TN
December 28, 1901	at Birmingham Athletic Association	W 37–13	2–0	Birmingham, AL
December 30, 1901	at Birmingham Athletic Association	L 15–19	2–1	Birmingham, AL
December 31, 1901	at Nashville Athletic Association	L 15–18	2–2	Nashville, TN
January 2, 1902	at Chattanooga Athletic Association	W 42–21	3–2	Chattanooga, TN
January 3, 1902	at Chattanooga Athletic Association	W 30–16	4–2	Chattanooga, TN
January 4, 1902	at Cincinnati YMCA	L 31–46	4–3	Cincinnati, OH
January 25, 1902	at Butler	W 30–23	5–3	Indianapolis, IN
February 7, 1902	Indiana State Normal	W 39–17	6–3	Lafayette Coliseum; West Lafayette, IN
February 15, 1902	at Indiana; Rivalry	W 32–8	7–3 (1–0)	Old Assembly Hall; West Lafayette, IN
February 19, 1902	Butler	W 71–24	8–3	Lafayette Coliseum; West Lafayette, IN
March 7, 1902	Indiana; Rivalry	W 71–25	9–3 (2–0)	Lafayette Coliseum; West Lafayette, IN
April 8, 1902	Yale	W 67–10	10–3	Lafayette Coliseum; West Lafayette, IN
*Non-conference game. (#) Tournament seedings in parentheses.
