= 1901–02 Minnesota Golden Gophers men's basketball team =

American college basketball season

1901–02 Minnesota Golden Gophers men's basketball
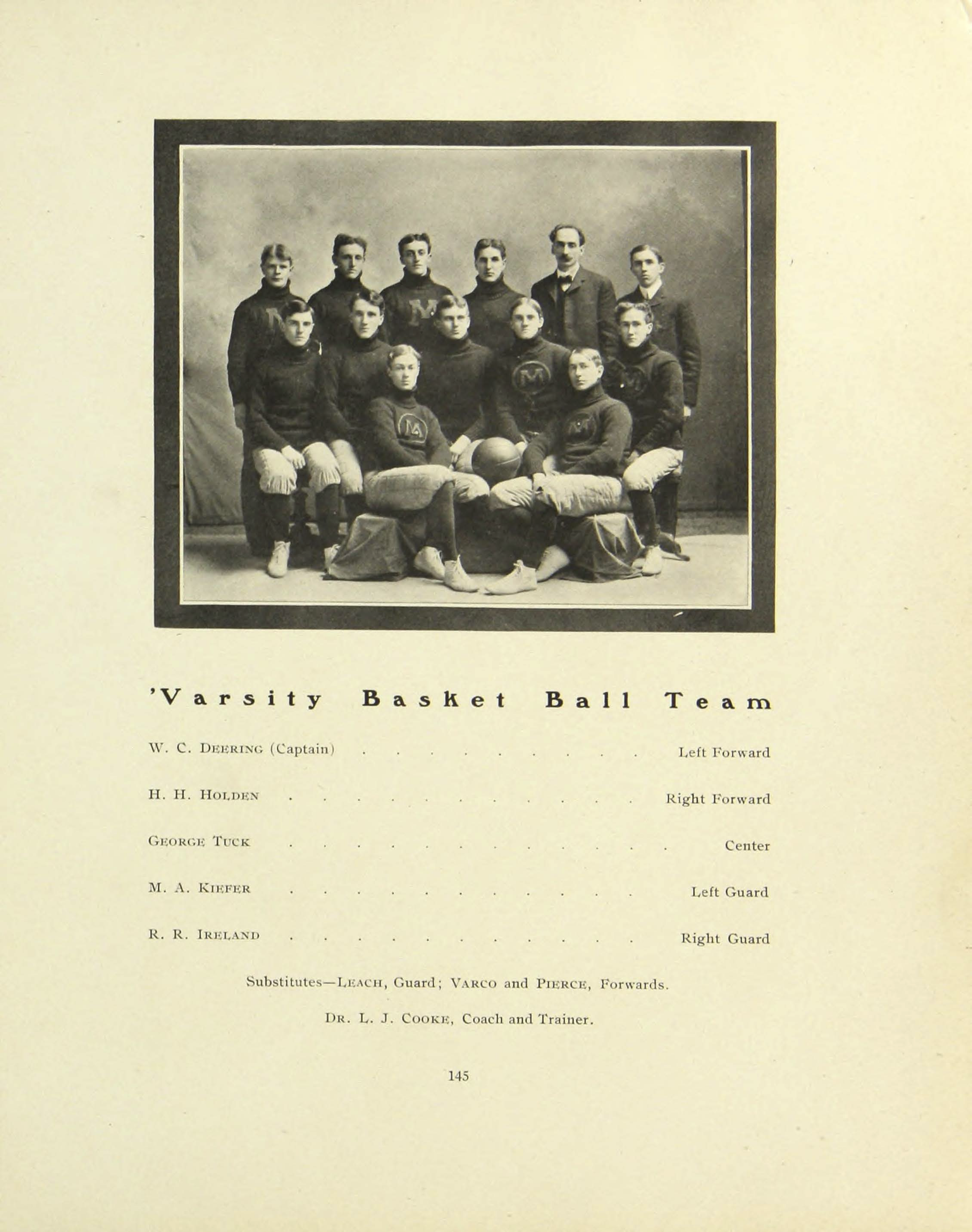

Helms Foundation National Champions
- Conference: Big Ten Conference
- Record: 15–0 (2–0 Western)
- Head coach: L. J. Cooke (5th season)
- Home arena: UM Armory

1901–02 Western Conference men's basketball standings
	Conf.				Overall
Team	W		L	PCT	W		L	PCT
Minnesota†*	2	–	0	1.000	15	–	0	1.000
Iowa		–		–	10	–	2	.833
Purdue	2	–	0	1.000	10	–	3	.769
Wisconsin	0	–	1	.000	7	–	3	.700
Indiana	0	–	2	.000	4	–	4	.500
† Intramural play only, the conference did not have an official championship *Minnesota was named Premo-Porretta and Helms Foundation National Champions winner

The 1901–02 Minnesota Golden Gophers men's basketball team represented the University of Minnesota in intercollegiate basketball during the 1901–02 season. The team finished the season with a 15–0 record and claimed the national intercollegiate championship as well as the overall amateur basketball championship of the United States..

The team was also later retroactively named national champions by the Helms Athletic Foundation and was retroactively listed as the top team of the season by the Premo-Porretta Power Poll.

== Starters ==
- William Deering – Forward
- Henry Holden – Forward
- George Tuck – Center
- M. A. Kiefer – Guard
- Roy Ireland – Guard

== Schedule ==
Date time, TV	Rank^{#}	Opponent^{#}	Result	Record	Site city, state
Regular season
11/30/1901*		Minnesota Alumni	W 44–11	1–0	UM Armory; Minneapolis, MN
12/7/1901*		Minnesota Sophomores	W 13–8	2–0	UM Armory; Minneapolis, MN
12/7/1901*		Minnesota Seniors	W 18–1	3–0	UM Armory; Minneapolis, MN
12/14/1901*		South High School	W 2–0	4–0	Minneapolis, MN
1/2/1902*		Yale	W 32–23	5–0	
1/11/1902*		East High School	W 44–14	6–0	
1/18/1902*		Central High School	W 22–5	7–0	
1/24/1902*		at North Dakota State	W 47–7	8–0	Fargo, ND
1/25/1902*		at Fargo High School	W 50–4	9–0	Fargo, ND
1/25/1902*		at Fargo College	W 28–21	10–0	Fargo, ND
2/1/1902*		Fond du Lac College East	W 22–16	11–0	
2/8/1902*		North Dakota State	W 60–9	12–0	
2/15/1902*		Nebraska	W 52–9	13–0	
2/22/1902		Wisconsin	W 30–10	14–0 (1–0)	UM Armory; Minneapolis, MN
3/1/1902		Iowa	W 49–10	15–0 (2–0)	
*Non-conference game. ^{#}Rankings from AP Poll. (#) Tournament seedings in parentheses.
