= J. Fred Powers =

American athlete and coach (1876–1946)

Biographical details
- Born: September 9 or 10, 1876; Vermont, U.S.
- Died: September 8, 1946 (aged 69); Worcester, Massachusetts, U.S.

Playing career

Track and field
- 1887–1899: Notre Dame
- 1899–1900: New York Athletic Club

Basketball
- 1897–1899: Notre Dame

Coaching career (HC unless noted)

Track and field
- 1900: Worcester HS (MA)
- 1901–1909: Holy Cross
- 1906–1923: Worcester Academy
- 1923–1937: Brown

Basketball
- 1898–1899: Notre Dame
- 1901–1909: Holy Cross

Head coaching record
- Overall: 56–33 (basketball)

John Frederick Powers (September 9 or 10, 1876 – September 8, 1946) was an American athlete and coach who was all-around champion at the 1899 Amateur Athletic Union Track and Field Championships. He was the head men's basketball coach at the University of Notre Dame (1898–1899) and the College of the Holy Cross (1901–1909) and track coach at Holy Cross (1901–1909) and Brown University (1923–1937).

== Athletics ==
Powers was born in Vermont^{1} and grew up in Worcester, Massachusetts. He began his involvement in athletics playing basketball at the Worcester YMCA. In 1893, he joined St. Paul's Lyceum and became a member of the organization's track team. He specialized in field events and was also a hurdler. In 1895 and 1896 he was a member of the Emmet Guards basketball and track teams. He dropped out of high school to work for his father, who managed a freight line.

In 1897, Powers enrolled at the University of Notre Dame, where he was a member of the track and field and basketball teams. He received the nickname "Track Team Powers" because he excelled at many track and field events and could outscore opposing teams singlehandedly. At the 1898 Indiana Intercollegiates, he outscored eight of the nine opposing colleges by himself. He won four events at the 1899 Western Intercollegiates and set a meet record in the shot put. At the 1899 Amateur Athletic Union Track and Field Championships, Powers won the overall title with 6203 points. He won the sixteen pound shot put, running high jump, 880 yard walk, sixteen pound hammer throw, the 120 yard hurdles, the running broad jump, and the pole vault and was 1,500 points ahead of his nearest competitor. After winning the title, Powers was persuaded by Mike Murphy to join the New York Athletic Club. He won six out of ten events for the club. A bout of typhoid fever ended his pursuit of the 1900 AAU title. He returned to Notre Dame in 1902 and planned on rejoining the track team, however the Amateur Athletic Union deemed that he was a professional because he had been a paid coach. He immediately left Notre Dame and competed in professional track meets.

== Coaching ==
During the 1898–99 season, Powers was captain and coach of the Notre Dame basketball team. In 1900, he was the track coach at Worcester High School. From 1901 to 1909, Powers coached track and basketball at the College of the Holy Cross. In 1902, he accepted the job as head track coach at Vanderbilt University, but chose to remain in Worcester after he was informed his sister was seriously ill. In 1906, he succeed Pooch Donovan as track and field coach at the Worcester Academy, where he trained Lawrence Whitney and Tony Hulman. In 1913, he was named trainer of the Harvard field athletes. From 1923 to 1937, he was the track coach at Brown. From 1938 to 1943, he was a recreation supervisor for the Work Projects Administration. He died on September 8, 1946 at Saint Vincent Hospital in Worcester after a long illness.

== Notes ==
1. Sources give Powers place of birth as Jericho, Vermont, Underhill Center, Vermont, and Burlington, Vermont
