= 1901–02 Connecticut Aggies men's basketball team =

American college basketball season

1901–02 Connecticut Aggies men's basketball
- Conference: Athletic League of New England State Colleges
- Record: 5–5 (0–0 ALNESC)

The 1901–02 Connecticut Aggies men's basketball team represented Connecticut Agricultural College, now the University of Connecticut, in the 1901–02 collegiate men's basketball season. The Aggies completed the season with a 5–5 record against mostly local high schools and YMCAs. The Aggies were members of the Athletic League of New England State Colleges.

== Schedule ==
Date time, TV	Rank^{#}	Opponent^{#}	Result	Record	Site (attendance) city, state
Regular Season
*		Willimantic YMCA	L 11–21	0–1	
*		Willimantic Bus. Coll.	W 70–11	1–1	
*		Middletown	L 30–33	1–2	
*		Middletown YMCA	L 27–66	1–3	
*		Willimantic YMCA	L 22–27	1–4	
*		Willimantic Comp. E	L 3–25	1–5	
*		Manchester High School	W 58–18	2–5	
*		Alumni	W 36–9	3–5	
*		Norwich Academy	W 30–6	4–5	
*		Willimantic TCC	W 16–15	5–5	
*Non-conference game. ^{#}Rankings from AP Poll. (#) Tournament seedings in parentheses. All times are in Eastern Time.

Schedule Source:
