= 1907–08 IAAUS men's basketball season =

Men's collegiate basketball season

- Championship series dates: March 21 – March 25, 1908
- National Championship: Game 1 Bartlett Gymnasium; Chicago, Illinois; Game 2 Weightman Hall; Philadelphia, Pennsylvania
- Intercollegiate National Champions: Chicago
- Helms National Champions: Chicago (retroactive selection in 1943)
- Player of the Year (Helms): Charles Keinath, Penn (retroactive selection in 1944)

The 1907–08 IAAUS men's basketball season began in December 1907, progressed through the regular season, and concluded in March 1908.

== Rule changes ==
- The position of inspector, a type of game official, was abolished. Previously, two inspectors — who had no decision-making powers — had worked each game as assistants to the referee, stationed at each end of the court and responsible for determining whether goals were scored in accordance with the rules, which they reported to the referee.

== Season headlines ==
- The Missouri Valley Intercollegiate Athletic Association began play, with six original members for basketball.
- Wabash (24–0) went undefeated during the season.
- Georgetown (5–1) claimed for itself the mythical title of "Champions of the South" for the 1907–08 season.
- Western Conference champion Chicago defeated Eastern Intercollegiate Basketball League champion Pennsylvania two games to none in an ad hoc three-game series billed as a collegiate national championship series. Based on this, Chicago claimed to be the mythical national champion of the 1907–08 season.
- Plagued by disagreements over playing rules and player eligibility, violent play, and teams failing to meet their obligation to play a complete league schedule on some occasions, the Eastern Intercollegiate Basketball League (EIBL) collapsed after the season. For the next two seasons, its teams played as independents. After a reorganization, the EIBL resumed competition in the 1910–11 season.
- In February 1943, the Helms Athletic Foundation retroactively selected Chicago as its national champion for the 1907–08 season.
- In 1995, the Premo-Porretta Power Poll retroactively selected Wabash as its top-ranked team for the 1907–08 season.

== Conference membership changes ==
School	Former Conference	New Conference
Drake Bulldogs	Independent	Missouri Valley Intercollegiate Athletic Association
Harvard Crimson	Eastern Intercollegiate Basketball League	Independent
Iowa State Cyclones	No major basketball program	Missouri Valley Intercollegiate Athletic Association
Kansas Jayhawks	Independent	Missouri Valley Intercollegiate Athletic Association
Missouri Tigers	Independent	Missouri Valley Intercollegiate Athletic Association
Nebraska Cornhuskers	Independent	Missouri Valley Intercollegiate Athletic Association
Washington University Bears	Independent	Missouri Valley Intercollegiate Athletic Association

== Regular season ==
=== Conferences ===
==== Conference winners ====
Conference	Regular- season winner	Conference Player of the Year	Conference tournament	Tournament venue (city)	Tournament winner
Eastern Intercollegiate Basketball League	Pennsylvania	None selected	No tournament		
Missouri Valley Intercollegiate Athletic Association	Nebraska (North); Kansas (South)	None selected	No tournament; Kansas was conference champion		
Western Conference	Chicago and Wisconsin	None selected	No tournament; Chicago won a conference championship game at Red Gym in Madison, Wisconsin		

==== Conference standings ====
1907–08 Eastern Intercollegiate Basketball League standings
	Conf.				Overall
Team	W		L	PCT	W		L	PCT
Penn	8	–	0	1.000	24	–	4	.857
Yale	5	–	3	.625	20	–	9	.690
Columbia	5	–	3	.625	10	–	11	.476
Princeton	1	–	7	.125	7	–	10	.412
Cornell	1	–	7	.125	5	–	8	.385

1907–08 Missouri Valley Intercollegiate Athletic Association men's basketball standings
	Conf.				Overall
Team	W		L	PCT	W		L	PCT
North Division
Nebraska	0	–	0	–	7	–	3	.700
Iowa State	1	–	0	1.000	1	–	1	.500
Drake	0	–	1	.000	1	–	6	.143
South Division
Kansas†	6	–	0	1.000	18	–	6	.750
Washington University	1	–	0	1.000	4	–	2	.667
Missouri	0	–	5	.000	8	–	10	.444
† Conference championship winner

1907–08 Western Conference men's basketball standings
	Conf.				Overall
Team	W		L	PCT	W		L	PCT
Chicago†	7	–	1	.875	23	–	2	.920
Wisconsin	7	–	1	.875	10	–	2	.833
Illinois	6	–	5	.545	20	–	6	.769
Minnesota	2	–	6	.250	12	–	7	.632
Purdue	0	–	8	.000	5	–	9	.357
Iowa	-	–	-	–	10	–	6	.625
Indiana	-	–	-	–	9	–	6	.600
Northwestern	-	–	-	–	2	–	7	.222
† Tie-breaker playoff game winner

=== Independents ===
A total of 98 college teams played as major independents. Among independents that played at least 10 games, Wabash (24–0), Allegheny (12–0), and Bucknell (12-0) were undefeated, and Wabash and Haskell (24–11) finished with the most wins.

1907–08 IAAUS men's basketball independents standings
	Conf.				Overall
Team	W		L	PCT	W		L	PCT
Allegheny		–		–	12	–	0	1.000
Bucknell		–		–	12	–	0	1.000
California		–		–	1	–	0	1.000
Cincinnati		–		–	9	–	0	1.000
Colorado Mines		–		–	5	–	0	1.000
Wabash		–		–	24	–	0	1.000
Washington and Lee		–		–	8	–	0	1.000
Brigham Young College		–		–	10	–	1	.909
Montana State		–		–	8	–	1	.889
Canisius		–		–	6	–	1	.857
Lehigh		–		–	6	–	1	.857
Mount Union		–		–	18	–	3	.857
Georgetown		–		–	5	–	1	.833
Illinois State		–		–	5	–	1	.833
Grinnell		–		–	14	–	3	.824
CCNY		–		–	9	–	2	.818
St. Lawrence		–		–	9	–	2	.818
Muhlenberg		–		–	4	–	1	.800
Washington State		–		–	12	–	3	.800
Nebraska Wesleyan		–		–	11	–	3	.786
Dayton		–		–	10	–	3	.769
Syracuse		–		–	10	–	3	.769
Army		–		–	9	–	3	.750
Michigan State		–		–	15	–	5	.750
Notre Dame		–		–	12	–	4	.750
Temple		–		–	6	–	2	.750
Dartmouth		–		–	11	–	4	.733
Hope		–		–	8	–	3	.727
Wake Forest		–		–	8	–	3	.727
Penn State		–		–	10	–	4	.714
Loyola (Md.)		–		–	12	–	5	.706
Wesleyan (Conn.)		–		–	12	–	5	.706
Southwestern (Kan.)		–		–	14	–	6	.700
Denison		–		–	11	–	5	.688
Haskell (Kan.)		–		–	24	–	11	.686
Baker		–		–	13	–	6	.684
Brigham Young		–		–	4	–	2	.667
Holy Cross		–		–	12	–	6	.667
Kalamazoo		–		–	2	–	1	.667
Trinity (N.C.)		–		–	4	–	2	.667
Bradley		–		–	9	–	5	.643
New York University		–		–	9	–	5	.643
Ohio		–		–	7	–	4	.636
Oregon Agricultural		–		–	7	–	4	.636
Pittsburgh		–		–	10	–	6	.625
Springfield (Mass.)		–		–	5	–	3	.625
Tulane		–		–	5	–	3	.625
Wooster		–		–	10	–	6	.625
Marietta		–		–	8	–	5	.615
Fordham		–		–	18	–	12	.600
Grove City		–		–	9	–	6	.600
North Dakota Agricultural		–		–	6	–	4	.600
Brown		–		–	11	–	8	.579
Oklahoma		–		–	4	–	3	.571
Auburn		–		–	5	–	5	.500
Butler		–		–	4	–	4	.500
Colorado		–		–	6	–	6	.500
Georgia		–		–	2	–	2	.500
Idaho		–		–	4	–	4	.500
Maine		–		–	5	–	5	.500
Navy		–		–	2	–	2	.500
Niagara		–		–	6	–	6	.500
Rhode Island A&M		–		–	8	–	8	.500
Southern California		–		–	3	–	3	.500
Virginia		–		–	5	–	5	.500
Wisconsin–Stevens Point		–		–	4	–	4	.500
Colgate		–		–	8	–	9	.471
Oregon		–		–	8	–	9	.471
Delaware		–		–	5	–	6	.455
Kentucky		–		–	5	–	6	.455
Ohio State		–		–	5	–	6	.455
Akron		–		–	4	–	5	.444
Manhattan		–		–	7	–	9	.438
Colorado Agricultural		–		–	2	–	3	.400
Connecticut		–		–	6	–	9	.400
Oklahoma A&M		–		–	2	–	3	.400
Westminster (Pa.)		–		–	6	–	9	.400
Fairmount		–		–	2	–	3	.400
Wyoming		–		–	2	–	3	.400
Vanderbilt		–		–	6	–	10	.375
Arizona		–		–	1	–	2	.333
Denver		–		–	1	–	2	.333
St. John's (NY)		–		–	4	–	8	.333
West Virginia		–		–	3	–	7	.300
Lake Forest		–		–	3	–	8	.273
Bloomsburg		–		–	3	–	9	.250
Harvard		–		–	4	–	12	.250
Indiana State		–		–	2	–	6	.250
William & Mary		–		–	1	–	4	.200
Trinity (Conn.)		–		–	2	–	10	.167
Union (N.Y.)		–		–	2	–	10	.167
Miami (Ohio)		–		–	1	–	7	.125
Kansas State		–		–	1	–	12	.077
New Mexico A&M		–		–	0	–	1	.000
Utah State		–		–	0	–	8	.000
Widener		–		–	0	–	2	.000

== Post-season ==
Arrangements were made in early March 1908, for Pennsylvania, champion of the Eastern Intercollegiate Basketball League, to meet the champion of the Western Conference in the post-season to determine the national champion. The postseason games were not organized by the IAAUS, so the resulting championship, while widely recognized at the time, is not an NCAA championship.

Chicago and Wisconsin finished the regular season tied for first place in the Western Conference. Representatives of the schools agreed to stage a single game to break the tie and determine which team would play Penn for the national championship. Wisconsin won a coin flip for the right to host the game.

Chicago defeated Wisconsin, 18–16, on March 12, in front of 1,800 spectators at the Red Gym in Madison. After the Maroons took a 9–7 halftime lead, the Badgers surged in front briefly in the second half, before Chicago seized control of the game. Senior captain John Schommer and junior Robert Harris tallied five points apiece, each scoring one basket and sinking three free throws, to lead the Maroons. Frederick Falls added four points, all on free throws, for Chicago. Biddy Rogers, Wisconsin's senior captain, scored six points, all from the charity stripe, to lead the Badgers, but he missed seven of his 13 attempts. Visiting Chicago fans stormed the court after the game and carried the Maroons players to the locker room.

The best-of-three national championship series was scheduled to begin at the teams' on-campus gyms in Chicago on March 21, and in Philadelphia on March 25. If necessary, the third game was to be played on Columbia's home court in New York on March 28. The first ever postseason games to determine a national champion attracted interest across the United States, and basketball critics generally agreed that the teams were worthy representatives of the eastern and western parts of the country. Pennsylvania was expecting such a large crowd for the second game that the school considered expanding the seating capacity of Weightman Hall.

A crowd of 1,800, thought to be the largest ever to attend a basketball tilt in the west, witnessed the first game of the intercollegiate national championship series at Bartlett Gymnasium. With Pennsylvania leading, 12–10, in the first half, Frederick Falls passed the ball to John Schommer, who had his back to the basket about 20 feet behind him. Schommer, without turning around, lifted the ball over his head and shot the ball through the rim, tying the game. The score was deadlocked at 13 at halftime. With the Maroons trailing, 17–16, in the second half, Schommer scored two baskets from long-range, sparking a decisive 5–0 run. Chicago held the Quakers to just a free throw the rest of the way and held on for a 21–18 victory. Schommer finished with eight points, and Falls led the Maroons with 11 points but shot only 7 for 15 from the free-throw line. Charles Keinath shot 12 for 14 from the charity stripe and finished with a game-high 12 points for the Quakers.

The largest crowd ever to attend a basketball game in the city of Philadelphia witnessed a tight contest that neither team led by more than three points. Fierce guarding by Pat Page made it difficult for Quakers star Charles Keinath to get shots at the basket. Keinath committed 11 fouls in the game, mostly trying to escape Page. With the score tied at 15, Frederick Falls gave the Maroons a lead with a free throw. In the closing seconds, Keinath, who was visibly tired from being hounded by Page, missed a pair of free throws, and Chicago held on for a 16–15 victory and the national championship. Falls finished with a game-high 10 points, all from the free-throw line, to lead the Maroons. Keinath scored nine points for Pennsylvania.

== Awards ==
=== Helms College Basketball All-Americans ===
The practice of selecting a Consensus All-American Team did not begin until the 1928–29 season. The Helms Athletic Foundation later retroactively selected a list of All-Americans for the 1907–08 season.

Player	Team
Hugh Harper	Wisconsin
Julian Hayward	Wesleyan (Conn.)
Charles Keinath	Penn
Haskell Noyes	Yale
Pat Page	Chicago
John Pryor	Brown
John Ryan	Columbia
John Schommer	Chicago
Ira Streusand	CCNY
Helmer Swenholt	Wisconsin

=== Major player of the year awards ===
- Helms Player of the Year: Charles Keinath, Penn (retroactive selection in 1944)

== Coaching changes ==
A number of teams changed coaches during the season and after it ended.

Team	Former Coach	Interim Coach	New Coach	Reason
Akron	Earl Williams		Dwight Bradley	
Baylor	Luther Burleson		Enoch J. Mills	
BYU	C. T. Teetzel		Fred Bennion	Teetzel left BYU to coach at Utah State.
Drexel	F. Bennett		G. Doughty	
Idaho	George Wyman		John S. Grogan	
Illinois	Fletcher Lane		Herb Juul	
Illinois State	William Bawden		George Binnewies	
Indiana	Ed Cook		Robert Harris	
Indiana State	John Kimmell		Eddy Conners	
Iowa	Ed Rule		John G. Griffith	
Marshall	L. B. Crotty		Boyd Chambers	
Miami (OH)	C. H. Martin		F. W. Stone	
Missouri	A. M. Ebright		Guy Lowman	
Montana State	Walter R. Knox		John H. McIntosh	
Navy	Joseph Finneran		Billy Lush	
New Mexico A&M	John O. Miller		V. Kays	
Niagara	John M. Reed		Robert Yates	
North Dakota	George Sweetland		David L. Dunlap	
North Dakota State	Gil Dobie		Paul Magoffin	
Oklahoma	David Hall		Bennie Owen	
Oklahoma State	Boyd Hill		William Schreiber	
Oregon Agricultural	Roy Heater		E. D. Angell	
Princeton	C. F. Kogel		Harry Shorter	
Purdue	Clarence B. Jamison		E. J. Stewart	
St. John's	J. Chestnut		P. Joseph Kersey	
Temple	John Crescenzo		Frederick Prosch	
Utah State	Mysterious Walker		C. T. Teetzel	
Vanderbilt	W. L. Throop		Ed Hamilton	
Washington State	John R. Bender		Fred Bohler	
Wofford	Chalmers Daniel		R. G. Bressler	
Wyoming	Lt. Coburn		Elmer Hoefer	
