= 1907–08 Georgetown Hoyas men's basketball team =

American college basketball season

1907–08 Georgetown Hoyas men's basketball
- Conference: Independent
- Record: 5–1
- Head coach: Maurice Joyce (1st season)
- Captain: Richard Downey
- Home arena: Convention Hall

1907–08 IAAUS men's basketball independents standings
	Conf.				Overall
Team	W		L	PCT	W		L	PCT
Allegheny		–		–	12	–	0	1.000
Bucknell		–		–	12	–	0	1.000
California		–		–	1	–	0	1.000
Cincinnati		–		–	9	–	0	1.000
Colorado Mines		–		–	5	–	0	1.000
Wabash		–		–	24	–	0	1.000
Washington and Lee		–		–	8	–	0	1.000
Brigham Young College		–		–	10	–	1	.909
Montana State		–		–	8	–	1	.889
Canisius		–		–	6	–	1	.857
Lehigh		–		–	6	–	1	.857
Mount Union		–		–	18	–	3	.857
Georgetown		–		–	5	–	1	.833
Illinois State		–		–	5	–	1	.833
Grinnell		–		–	14	–	3	.824
CCNY		–		–	9	–	2	.818
St. Lawrence		–		–	9	–	2	.818
Muhlenberg		–		–	4	–	1	.800
Washington State		–		–	12	–	3	.800
Nebraska Wesleyan		–		–	11	–	3	.786
Dayton		–		–	10	–	3	.769
Syracuse		–		–	10	–	3	.769
Army		–		–	9	–	3	.750
Michigan State		–		–	15	–	5	.750
Notre Dame		–		–	12	–	4	.750
Temple		–		–	6	–	2	.750
Dartmouth		–		–	11	–	4	.733
Hope		–		–	8	–	3	.727
Wake Forest		–		–	8	–	3	.727
Penn State		–		–	10	–	4	.714
Loyola (Md.)		–		–	12	–	5	.706
Wesleyan (Conn.)		–		–	12	–	5	.706
Southwestern (Kan.)		–		–	14	–	6	.700
Denison		–		–	11	–	5	.688
Haskell (Kan.)		–		–	24	–	11	.686
Baker		–		–	13	–	6	.684
Brigham Young		–		–	4	–	2	.667
Holy Cross		–		–	12	–	6	.667
Kalamazoo		–		–	2	–	1	.667
Trinity (N.C.)		–		–	4	–	2	.667
Bradley		–		–	9	–	5	.643
New York University		–		–	9	–	5	.643
Ohio		–		–	7	–	4	.636
Oregon Agricultural		–		–	7	–	4	.636
Pittsburgh		–		–	10	–	6	.625
Springfield (Mass.)		–		–	5	–	3	.625
Tulane		–		–	5	–	3	.625
Wooster		–		–	10	–	6	.625
Marietta		–		–	8	–	5	.615
Fordham		–		–	18	–	12	.600
Grove City		–		–	9	–	6	.600
North Dakota Agricultural		–		–	6	–	4	.600
Brown		–		–	11	–	8	.579
Oklahoma		–		–	4	–	3	.571
Auburn		–		–	5	–	5	.500
Butler		–		–	4	–	4	.500
Colorado		–		–	6	–	6	.500
Georgia		–		–	2	–	2	.500
Idaho		–		–	4	–	4	.500
Maine		–		–	5	–	5	.500
Navy		–		–	2	–	2	.500
Niagara		–		–	6	–	6	.500
Rhode Island A&M		–		–	8	–	8	.500
Southern California		–		–	3	–	3	.500
Virginia		–		–	5	–	5	.500
Wisconsin–Stevens Point		–		–	4	–	4	.500
Colgate		–		–	8	–	9	.471
Oregon		–		–	8	–	9	.471
Delaware		–		–	5	–	6	.455
Kentucky		–		–	5	–	6	.455
Ohio State		–		–	5	–	6	.455
Akron		–		–	4	–	5	.444
Manhattan		–		–	7	–	9	.438
Colorado Agricultural		–		–	2	–	3	.400
Connecticut		–		–	6	–	9	.400
Oklahoma A&M		–		–	2	–	3	.400
Westminster (Pa.)		–		–	6	–	9	.400
Fairmount		–		–	2	–	3	.400
Wyoming		–		–	2	–	3	.400
Vanderbilt		–		–	6	–	10	.375
Arizona		–		–	1	–	2	.333
Denver		–		–	1	–	2	.333
St. John's (NY)		–		–	4	–	8	.333
West Virginia		–		–	3	–	7	.300
Lake Forest		–		–	3	–	8	.273
Bloomsburg		–		–	3	–	9	.250
Harvard		–		–	4	–	12	.250
Indiana State		–		–	2	–	6	.250
William & Mary		–		–	1	–	4	.200
Trinity (Conn.)		–		–	2	–	10	.167
Union (N.Y.)		–		–	2	–	10	.167
Miami (Ohio)		–		–	1	–	7	.125
Kansas State		–		–	1	–	12	.077
New Mexico A&M		–		–	0	–	1	.000
Utah State		–		–	0	–	8	.000
Widener		–		–	0	–	2	.000

The 1907–08 Georgetown Hoyas men's basketball team represented Georgetown University during the 1907–08 Intercollegiate Athletic Association of the United States college basketball season. Maurice Joyce coached the team in his first season as head coach. Georgetown was an independent and played its home games at the Convention Hall at 5th and K Streets NW in downtown Washington, D.C.

== Maurice Joyce ==
Maurice Joyce introduced the new sport of basketball to Washington, D.C., in 1892 – the year after its invention by James Naismith – and had fostered its development there over the next 15 years as Director of Physical Education at the Carroll Institute. In the autumn of 1906, Georgetown had hired him as its athletic director with an eye toward developing a men's basketball program at the school, and he had founded the program late that year, in time to field Georgetown's first team in the 1906–07 season. That team had had no coach, relying instead on an elected student manager to provide leadership, monitor the team's finances, and schedule games and practices – roles now performed by the school's athletic department and coach. For Georgetown's second season in 1907–08, Joyce formally became the team's first head coach, although this did not diminish the role of the student manager, who continued in his duties; rather, the head coach acted as a teacher and faculty advisor, available to provide advice to the players during games rather than lead the team on the court. It was not until the late 1920s that the modern role of the head coach as in-game leader emerged.

== Season recap ==
During its inaugural season in 1906–07, Georgetown had played only four games, three of them against George Washington. George Washington had won two of the three games, led by center Fred Rice. When George Washington decided not to field a basketball team for the 1907-08 season, Joyce convinced Rice to enroll in Georgetown University Law School and play for the Hoyas in 1907–08.

In a low-scoring era, Rice got off to a spectacular start with his new team, scoring 20 or more points in four of his first seven games. Starting all seven games he played, he had no free-throw attempts, but he scored 52 field goals, giving him 104 points and an average of 14.9 points per game; only one other Georgetown player would equal his per-game scoring average in the next 35 years. Rice would star for Georgetown for two more seasons before graduating from the Law School.

Considered the first great team in Georgetown men's basketball history, the 1907-08 squad won its first five games before losing an exhibition game to Rutgers and suffering its only regular-season loss to a Pennsylvania team that went 23–4 for the year. The Hoyas finished the season with a record of 5–1 and claimed for itself the mythical title of "Champions of the South" for the 1907–08 season.

== Roster ==
The 1907-1908 team photo. Bottom row: James Colliflower, Bill Rice. Center row: Fred Rice, Richard Downey, John Crogan. Top row: George Colliflower, Dilkes (first name unknown) (manager), Maurice Joyce (coach), O'Neill (first name unknown) (manager)

Name	Height	Weight (lbs.)	Position	Class	Hometown	Previous Team(s)
George Colliflower	N/A	N/A	G	Grad. Stud.	Washington, DC, U.S.	Georgetown Preparatory School (North Bethesda, MD)
James Colliflower	N/A	N/A	F	Grad. Stud.	Washington, DC, U.S.	Georgetown Preparatory School (North Bethesda, MD)
John Crogan	N/A	N/A	F	Fr.	Washington, DC, U.S.	N/A
Richard Downey	N/A	N/A	C	Grad. Stud.	N/A	N/A
Bill Rice	N/A	N/A	G	Grad. Stud.	Kingston, NY, U.S.	N/A
Fred Rice	N/A	N/A	C	Grad. Stud.	Washington, DC, U.S.	George Washington University

== 1907–08 schedule and results ==
Date time, TV	Opponent	Result	Record	Site city, state
Regular Season
Wed., Dec. 18, 1907 no, no	vs. Maryland	W 58–3	1-0	Carroll Institute; Washington, DC
Fri., Dec. 20, 1907 no, no	Columbia	W 22–18	2-0	Convention Hall; Washington, DC
Sat., Jan. 11, 1908 no, no	William & Mary	W 62–8	exhibition	Convention Hall; Washington, DC
Sat., Jan. 18, 1908 no, no	Fordham	W 25–14	3-0	Convention Hall; Washington, DC
Fri., Jan. 24, 1908 no, no	at Virginia	W 42–19	4-0	Fayerweather Gymnasium; Charlottesville, VA
Fri., Jan. 31, 1908 no, no	Virginia	W 64–12	5-0	Convention Hall; Washington, DC
Fri., Feb. 21, 1908 no, no	at Fordham	L 29–31	exhibition	Savage School Gymnasium; New York, NY
Sun., Mar. 1, 1908 no, no	Fordham	cancelled		Convention Hall; Washington, DC
Sun., Mar. 15, 1908 no, no	at Pennsylvania	L 17–33	5-1	Weightmann Hall; Philadelphia, PA
*Non-conference game. (#) Tournament seedings in parentheses.
