= 1907–08 Penn State Nittany Lions basketball team =

American college basketball season

1907–1908 Penn State Nittany Lions men's basketball
- Conference: Independent
- Record: 11–2
- Head coach: student coaches
- Captain: E.G. DuBarry
- Home arena: Armory

1907–08 IAAUS men's basketball independents standings
	Conf.				Overall
Team	W		L	PCT	W		L	PCT
Allegheny		–		–	12	–	0	1.000
Bucknell		–		–	12	–	0	1.000
California		–		–	1	–	0	1.000
Cincinnati		–		–	9	–	0	1.000
Colorado Mines		–		–	5	–	0	1.000
Wabash		–		–	24	–	0	1.000
Washington and Lee		–		–	8	–	0	1.000
Brigham Young College		–		–	10	–	1	.909
Montana State		–		–	8	–	1	.889
Canisius		–		–	6	–	1	.857
Lehigh		–		–	6	–	1	.857
Mount Union		–		–	18	–	3	.857
Georgetown		–		–	5	–	1	.833
Illinois State		–		–	5	–	1	.833
Grinnell		–		–	14	–	3	.824
CCNY		–		–	9	–	2	.818
St. Lawrence		–		–	9	–	2	.818
Muhlenberg		–		–	4	–	1	.800
Washington State		–		–	12	–	3	.800
Nebraska Wesleyan		–		–	11	–	3	.786
Dayton		–		–	10	–	3	.769
Syracuse		–		–	10	–	3	.769
Army		–		–	9	–	3	.750
Michigan State		–		–	15	–	5	.750
Notre Dame		–		–	12	–	4	.750
Temple		–		–	6	–	2	.750
Dartmouth		–		–	11	–	4	.733
Hope		–		–	8	–	3	.727
Wake Forest		–		–	8	–	3	.727
Penn State		–		–	10	–	4	.714
Loyola (Md.)		–		–	12	–	5	.706
Wesleyan (Conn.)		–		–	12	–	5	.706
Southwestern (Kan.)		–		–	14	–	6	.700
Denison		–		–	11	–	5	.688
Haskell (Kan.)		–		–	24	–	11	.686
Baker		–		–	13	–	6	.684
Brigham Young		–		–	4	–	2	.667
Holy Cross		–		–	12	–	6	.667
Kalamazoo		–		–	2	–	1	.667
Trinity (N.C.)		–		–	4	–	2	.667
Bradley		–		–	9	–	5	.643
New York University		–		–	9	–	5	.643
Ohio		–		–	7	–	4	.636
Oregon Agricultural		–		–	7	–	4	.636
Pittsburgh		–		–	10	–	6	.625
Springfield (Mass.)		–		–	5	–	3	.625
Tulane		–		–	5	–	3	.625
Wooster		–		–	10	–	6	.625
Marietta		–		–	8	–	5	.615
Fordham		–		–	18	–	12	.600
Grove City		–		–	9	–	6	.600
North Dakota Agricultural		–		–	6	–	4	.600
Brown		–		–	11	–	8	.579
Oklahoma		–		–	4	–	3	.571
Auburn		–		–	5	–	5	.500
Butler		–		–	4	–	4	.500
Colorado		–		–	6	–	6	.500
Georgia		–		–	2	–	2	.500
Idaho		–		–	4	–	4	.500
Maine		–		–	5	–	5	.500
Navy		–		–	2	–	2	.500
Niagara		–		–	6	–	6	.500
Rhode Island A&M		–		–	8	–	8	.500
Southern California		–		–	3	–	3	.500
Virginia		–		–	5	–	5	.500
Wisconsin–Stevens Point		–		–	4	–	4	.500
Colgate		–		–	8	–	9	.471
Oregon		–		–	8	–	9	.471
Delaware		–		–	5	–	6	.455
Kentucky		–		–	5	–	6	.455
Ohio State		–		–	5	–	6	.455
Akron		–		–	4	–	5	.444
Manhattan		–		–	7	–	9	.438
Colorado Agricultural		–		–	2	–	3	.400
Connecticut		–		–	6	–	9	.400
Oklahoma A&M		–		–	2	–	3	.400
Westminster (Pa.)		–		–	6	–	9	.400
Fairmount		–		–	2	–	3	.400
Wyoming		–		–	2	–	3	.400
Vanderbilt		–		–	6	–	10	.375
Arizona		–		–	1	–	2	.333
Denver		–		–	1	–	2	.333
St. John's (NY)		–		–	4	–	8	.333
West Virginia		–		–	3	–	7	.300
Lake Forest		–		–	3	–	8	.273
Bloomsburg		–		–	3	–	9	.250
Harvard		–		–	4	–	12	.250
Indiana State		–		–	2	–	6	.250
William & Mary		–		–	1	–	4	.200
Trinity (Conn.)		–		–	2	–	10	.167
Union (N.Y.)		–		–	2	–	10	.167
Miami (Ohio)		–		–	1	–	7	.125
Kansas State		–		–	1	–	12	.077
New Mexico A&M		–		–	0	–	1	.000
Utah State		–		–	0	–	8	.000
Widener		–		–	0	–	2	.000

The 1907–1908 Penn State Nittany Lions basketball team represented Penn State University during the 1907–08 college men's basketball season. The team finished with a final record of 11–2.

== Schedule ==
Date time, TV	Opponent	Result	Record	Site city, state
1/11/1908*	Wyoming Seminary	W 40–11	1–0	Armory; University Park, PA
2/6/1908*	Pittsburgh	W 30–13	2–0	Armory; University Park, PA
2/12/1908*	at Franklin & Marshall	W 36–11	3–0	Lancaster, PA
2/13/1907*	at Delaware	W 29–19	4–0	Newark, DE
2/14/1908*	at Pennsylvania	L 19–28	4–1	Philadelphia, PA
2/15/1908*	at Pennsylvania	L 16–35	5–1	Philadelphia, PA
2/18/1907*	George Washington	W 47–4	6–1	Armory; University Park, PA
2/20/1907*	Swarthmore	L 16–32	7–1	Armory; University Park, PA
2/25/1908*	at Bucknell	L 13–20	7–2	Lewisburg, PA
2/26/1908*	at Fordham	W 27–21	8–2	Bronx, NY
2/27/1908*	at Manhattan	W 29–26	9–2	Riverdale, NY
2/28/1908*	at CCNY	L 9–28	9–3	
2/29/1908*	at Lehigh	L 16–24	9–4	Bethlehem, PA
3/6/1908*	Delaware	W 47–11	10–4	Armory; University Park, PA
*Non-conference game. (#) Tournament seedings in parentheses.
