= 1907–08 Kentucky Wildcats men's basketball team =

1907–08 season of University of Kentucky men's basketball team

1907–08 Kentucky Wildcats men's basketball
- Conference: Independent
- Record: 5–6
- Head coach: Unnamed (4th season)
- Home arena: State College Gymnasium

1907–08 IAAUS men's basketball independents standings
	Conf.				Overall
Team	W		L	PCT	W		L	PCT
Allegheny		–		–	12	–	0	1.000
Bucknell		–		–	12	–	0	1.000
California		–		–	1	–	0	1.000
Cincinnati		–		–	9	–	0	1.000
Colorado Mines		–		–	5	–	0	1.000
Wabash		–		–	24	–	0	1.000
Washington and Lee		–		–	8	–	0	1.000
Brigham Young College		–		–	10	–	1	.909
Montana State		–		–	8	–	1	.889
Canisius		–		–	6	–	1	.857
Lehigh		–		–	6	–	1	.857
Mount Union		–		–	18	–	3	.857
Georgetown		–		–	5	–	1	.833
Illinois State		–		–	5	–	1	.833
Grinnell		–		–	14	–	3	.824
CCNY		–		–	9	–	2	.818
St. Lawrence		–		–	9	–	2	.818
Muhlenberg		–		–	4	–	1	.800
Washington State		–		–	12	–	3	.800
Nebraska Wesleyan		–		–	11	–	3	.786
Dayton		–		–	10	–	3	.769
Syracuse		–		–	10	–	3	.769
Army		–		–	9	–	3	.750
Michigan State		–		–	15	–	5	.750
Notre Dame		–		–	12	–	4	.750
Temple		–		–	6	–	2	.750
Dartmouth		–		–	11	–	4	.733
Hope		–		–	8	–	3	.727
Wake Forest		–		–	8	–	3	.727
Penn State		–		–	10	–	4	.714
Loyola (Md.)		–		–	12	–	5	.706
Wesleyan (Conn.)		–		–	12	–	5	.706
Southwestern (Kan.)		–		–	14	–	6	.700
Denison		–		–	11	–	5	.688
Haskell (Kan.)		–		–	24	–	11	.686
Baker		–		–	13	–	6	.684
Brigham Young		–		–	4	–	2	.667
Holy Cross		–		–	12	–	6	.667
Kalamazoo		–		–	2	–	1	.667
Trinity (N.C.)		–		–	4	–	2	.667
Bradley		–		–	9	–	5	.643
New York University		–		–	9	–	5	.643
Ohio		–		–	7	–	4	.636
Oregon Agricultural		–		–	7	–	4	.636
Pittsburgh		–		–	10	–	6	.625
Springfield (Mass.)		–		–	5	–	3	.625
Tulane		–		–	5	–	3	.625
Wooster		–		–	10	–	6	.625
Marietta		–		–	8	–	5	.615
Fordham		–		–	18	–	12	.600
Grove City		–		–	9	–	6	.600
North Dakota Agricultural		–		–	6	–	4	.600
Brown		–		–	11	–	8	.579
Oklahoma		–		–	4	–	3	.571
Auburn		–		–	5	–	5	.500
Butler		–		–	4	–	4	.500
Colorado		–		–	6	–	6	.500
Georgia		–		–	2	–	2	.500
Idaho		–		–	4	–	4	.500
Maine		–		–	5	–	5	.500
Navy		–		–	2	–	2	.500
Niagara		–		–	6	–	6	.500
Rhode Island A&M		–		–	8	–	8	.500
Southern California		–		–	3	–	3	.500
Virginia		–		–	5	–	5	.500
Wisconsin–Stevens Point		–		–	4	–	4	.500
Colgate		–		–	8	–	9	.471
Oregon		–		–	8	–	9	.471
Delaware		–		–	5	–	6	.455
Kentucky		–		–	5	–	6	.455
Ohio State		–		–	5	–	6	.455
Akron		–		–	4	–	5	.444
Manhattan		–		–	7	–	9	.438
Colorado Agricultural		–		–	2	–	3	.400
Connecticut		–		–	6	–	9	.400
Oklahoma A&M		–		–	2	–	3	.400
Westminster (Pa.)		–		–	6	–	9	.400
Fairmount		–		–	2	–	3	.400
Wyoming		–		–	2	–	3	.400
Vanderbilt		–		–	6	–	10	.375
Arizona		–		–	1	–	2	.333
Denver		–		–	1	–	2	.333
St. John's (NY)		–		–	4	–	8	.333
West Virginia		–		–	3	–	7	.300
Lake Forest		–		–	3	–	8	.273
Bloomsburg		–		–	3	–	9	.250
Harvard		–		–	4	–	12	.250
Indiana State		–		–	2	–	6	.250
William & Mary		–		–	1	–	4	.200
Trinity (Conn.)		–		–	2	–	10	.167
Union (N.Y.)		–		–	2	–	10	.167
Miami (Ohio)		–		–	1	–	7	.125
Kansas State		–		–	1	–	12	.077
New Mexico A&M		–		–	0	–	1	.000
Utah State		–		–	0	–	8	.000
Widener		–		–	0	–	2	.000

The 1907–08 Kentucky State men's basketball team competed on behalf of the University of Kentucky during the 1907–08 season. The team finished with a final record of 5–6.

== Roster ==
1904–05 Kentucky Wildcats men's basketball team
Players
Coaches

Pos.	#	Name	Height	Weight	Year	Previous school	Hometown
F		Leo Brewer	—	—	Sr	Unknown	Mayfield, Kentucky
C		Harold Downing	—	—	Sr	Unknown	Lexington, Kentucky
F		Neville Stone	—	—	Sr	Unknown	Earlington, Kentucky
G		Maury Wilson	5 ft 10 in (1.78 m)	148 lb (67 kg)	Sr	Louisville Male High School	Louisville, Kentucky
G		Richard Barbee	5 ft 8 in (1.73 m)	152 lb (69 kg)	So	Unknown	Lexington, Kentucky
F		Shelby Shanklin	5 ft 9 in (1.75 m)	150 lb (68 kg)	Jr	Unknown	Lexington, Kentucky
F/C		Walter Fox	—	—	So	Unknown	Newport, Kentucky
F		Shelby Post	—	—	So	Unknown	Kingston, New York

Head coach

- Unnamed

Assistant coach(es)

{{{asst_coach}}}

Legend

- (C) Team captain
- (S) Suspended
- (I) Ineligible
- (W) Walk-on
- Injured
- Current redshirt

== Schedule ==
Date time, TV	Rank^{#}	Opponent^{#}	Result	Record	Site city, state
Regular Season
1/10/1908*		Lexington YMCA	L 19–29	0–1	Lexington YMCA; Lexington, KY
1/21/1908*		Kentucky University (now Transylvania)	W 20–15	1–1	State College Gymnasium; Lexington, KY
1/25/1908*		Centre	L 21–32	1–2	Danville, KY
2/4/1908*		Kentucky University (now Transylvania)	W 20–15	2–2	State College Gymnasium; Lexington, KY
2/4/1908*		Louisville Coliseum	W 29–28	3–2	State College Gymnasium; Louisville, KY
2/8/1908*		Georgetown College	L 22–30	3–3	Georgetown College; Georgetown, KY
2/13/1908*		Centre	W 31–20	4–3	State College Gymnasium; Lexington, KY
2/15/1908*		Lexington YMCA	L 19–23	4–4	State College Gymnasium; Lexington, KY
2/22/1908*		Louisville Coliseum	L 18–30	4–5	Louisville Colisuem; Louisville, KY
3/3/1908*		Georgetown College	W 18–13	5–5	State College Gymnasium; Lexington, KY
3/7/1908*		Centre; State Championship	L 10–29	5–6	Danville, KY
*Non-conference game. ^{#}Rankings from AP Poll. (#) Tournament seedings in parentheses.
