= 1907–08 NYU Violets men's basketball team =

American college basketball season

1907–08 NYU Violets men's basketball
- Conference: Independent
- Record: 7–5
- Captain: Thomas Bowe

1907–08 IAAUS men's basketball independents standings
	Conf.				Overall
Team	W		L	PCT	W		L	PCT
Allegheny		–		–	12	–	0	1.000
Bucknell		–		–	12	–	0	1.000
California		–		–	1	–	0	1.000
Cincinnati		–		–	9	–	0	1.000
Colorado Mines		–		–	5	–	0	1.000
Wabash		–		–	24	–	0	1.000
Washington and Lee		–		–	8	–	0	1.000
Brigham Young College		–		–	10	–	1	.909
Montana State		–		–	8	–	1	.889
Canisius		–		–	6	–	1	.857
Lehigh		–		–	6	–	1	.857
Mount Union		–		–	18	–	3	.857
Georgetown		–		–	5	–	1	.833
Illinois State		–		–	5	–	1	.833
Grinnell		–		–	14	–	3	.824
CCNY		–		–	9	–	2	.818
St. Lawrence		–		–	9	–	2	.818
Muhlenberg		–		–	4	–	1	.800
Washington State		–		–	12	–	3	.800
Nebraska Wesleyan		–		–	11	–	3	.786
Dayton		–		–	10	–	3	.769
Syracuse		–		–	10	–	3	.769
Army		–		–	9	–	3	.750
Michigan State		–		–	15	–	5	.750
Notre Dame		–		–	12	–	4	.750
Temple		–		–	6	–	2	.750
Dartmouth		–		–	11	–	4	.733
Hope		–		–	8	–	3	.727
Wake Forest		–		–	8	–	3	.727
Penn State		–		–	10	–	4	.714
Loyola (Md.)		–		–	12	–	5	.706
Wesleyan (Conn.)		–		–	12	–	5	.706
Southwestern (Kan.)		–		–	14	–	6	.700
Denison		–		–	11	–	5	.688
Haskell (Kan.)		–		–	24	–	11	.686
Baker		–		–	13	–	6	.684
Brigham Young		–		–	4	–	2	.667
Holy Cross		–		–	12	–	6	.667
Kalamazoo		–		–	2	–	1	.667
Trinity (N.C.)		–		–	4	–	2	.667
Bradley		–		–	9	–	5	.643
New York University		–		–	9	–	5	.643
Ohio		–		–	7	–	4	.636
Oregon Agricultural		–		–	7	–	4	.636
Pittsburgh		–		–	10	–	6	.625
Springfield (Mass.)		–		–	5	–	3	.625
Tulane		–		–	5	–	3	.625
Wooster		–		–	10	–	6	.625
Marietta		–		–	8	–	5	.615
Fordham		–		–	18	–	12	.600
Grove City		–		–	9	–	6	.600
North Dakota Agricultural		–		–	6	–	4	.600
Brown		–		–	11	–	8	.579
Oklahoma		–		–	4	–	3	.571
Auburn		–		–	5	–	5	.500
Butler		–		–	4	–	4	.500
Colorado		–		–	6	–	6	.500
Georgia		–		–	2	–	2	.500
Idaho		–		–	4	–	4	.500
Maine		–		–	5	–	5	.500
Navy		–		–	2	–	2	.500
Niagara		–		–	6	–	6	.500
Rhode Island A&M		–		–	8	–	8	.500
Southern California		–		–	3	–	3	.500
Virginia		–		–	5	–	5	.500
Wisconsin–Stevens Point		–		–	4	–	4	.500
Colgate		–		–	8	–	9	.471
Oregon		–		–	8	–	9	.471
Delaware		–		–	5	–	6	.455
Kentucky		–		–	5	–	6	.455
Ohio State		–		–	5	–	6	.455
Akron		–		–	4	–	5	.444
Manhattan		–		–	7	–	9	.438
Colorado Agricultural		–		–	2	–	3	.400
Connecticut		–		–	6	–	9	.400
Oklahoma A&M		–		–	2	–	3	.400
Westminster (Pa.)		–		–	6	–	9	.400
Fairmount		–		–	2	–	3	.400
Wyoming		–		–	2	–	3	.400
Vanderbilt		–		–	6	–	10	.375
Arizona		–		–	1	–	2	.333
Denver		–		–	1	–	2	.333
St. John's (NY)		–		–	4	–	8	.333
West Virginia		–		–	3	–	7	.300
Lake Forest		–		–	3	–	8	.273
Bloomsburg		–		–	3	–	9	.250
Harvard		–		–	4	–	12	.250
Indiana State		–		–	2	–	6	.250
William & Mary		–		–	1	–	4	.200
Trinity (Conn.)		–		–	2	–	10	.167
Union (N.Y.)		–		–	2	–	10	.167
Miami (Ohio)		–		–	1	–	7	.125
Kansas State		–		–	1	–	12	.077
New Mexico A&M		–		–	0	–	1	.000
Utah State		–		–	0	–	8	.000
Widener		–		–	0	–	2	.000

The 1907–08 NYU Violets men's basketball team represented New York University during the 1907–08 college men's basketball season. The team finished with an overall record of 7–5.

== Schedule ==
Date time, TV	Opponent	Result	Record	Site city, state
Dec. 6, 1907	St. John's	W 34–13	1–0	New York, NY
Dec. 13, 1907	at Brooklyn Polytechnic	W 29–17	2–0	
Dec. 14, 1907	at Army	W 23–20	3–0	West Point, NY
Jan. 8, 1908	at Princeton	L 18–44	3–1	University Gymnasium; Princeton, NJ
Jan. 10, 1908	Rutgers	W 47–22	4–1	Original College Avenue Gymnasium; New Brunswick, NJ
Jan. 17, 1908	at Pratt	W 41–24	5–1	Brooklyn, NY
Jan. 22, 1908	Rutgers	W 35–14	6–1	Original College Avenue Gymnasium; New Brunswick, NJ
Feb. 7, 1908	R.P.I.	L 18–20	6–2	New York, NY
Feb. 14, 1908	Princeton	L 08–30	6–3	New York, NY
Feb. 21, 1908	Hamilton	L 20–24	6–4	New York, NY
Feb. 28, 1908	at R.P.I	L 29–31	6–5	Troy, NY
Mar. 7, 1908	Union	W 34–6	7–5	New York, NY
*Non-conference game. (#) Tournament seedings in parentheses.
