= 1907–08 Holy Cross Crusaders men's basketball team =

American college basketball season

1907–08 Holy Cross Crusaders men's basketball
- Conference: Independent
- Record: 12–6
- Head coach: J. Fred Powers (6th season)
- Captain: Thomas J. Faherty
- Home arena: N/A

1907–08 IAAUS men's basketball independents standings
	Conf.				Overall
Team	W		L	PCT	W		L	PCT
Allegheny		–		–	12	–	0	1.000
Bucknell		–		–	12	–	0	1.000
California		–		–	1	–	0	1.000
Cincinnati		–		–	9	–	0	1.000
Colorado Mines		–		–	5	–	0	1.000
Wabash		–		–	24	–	0	1.000
Washington and Lee		–		–	8	–	0	1.000
Brigham Young College		–		–	10	–	1	.909
Montana State		–		–	8	–	1	.889
Canisius		–		–	6	–	1	.857
Lehigh		–		–	6	–	1	.857
Mount Union		–		–	18	–	3	.857
Georgetown		–		–	5	–	1	.833
Illinois State		–		–	5	–	1	.833
Grinnell		–		–	14	–	3	.824
CCNY		–		–	9	–	2	.818
St. Lawrence		–		–	9	–	2	.818
Muhlenberg		–		–	4	–	1	.800
Washington State		–		–	12	–	3	.800
Nebraska Wesleyan		–		–	11	–	3	.786
Dayton		–		–	10	–	3	.769
Syracuse		–		–	10	–	3	.769
Army		–		–	9	–	3	.750
Michigan State		–		–	15	–	5	.750
Notre Dame		–		–	12	–	4	.750
Temple		–		–	6	–	2	.750
Dartmouth		–		–	11	–	4	.733
Hope		–		–	8	–	3	.727
Wake Forest		–		–	8	–	3	.727
Penn State		–		–	10	–	4	.714
Loyola (Md.)		–		–	12	–	5	.706
Wesleyan (Conn.)		–		–	12	–	5	.706
Southwestern (Kan.)		–		–	14	–	6	.700
Denison		–		–	11	–	5	.688
Haskell (Kan.)		–		–	24	–	11	.686
Baker		–		–	13	–	6	.684
Brigham Young		–		–	4	–	2	.667
Holy Cross		–		–	12	–	6	.667
Kalamazoo		–		–	2	–	1	.667
Trinity (N.C.)		–		–	4	–	2	.667
Bradley		–		–	9	–	5	.643
New York University		–		–	9	–	5	.643
Ohio		–		–	7	–	4	.636
Oregon Agricultural		–		–	7	–	4	.636
Pittsburgh		–		–	10	–	6	.625
Springfield (Mass.)		–		–	5	–	3	.625
Tulane		–		–	5	–	3	.625
Wooster		–		–	10	–	6	.625
Marietta		–		–	8	–	5	.615
Fordham		–		–	18	–	12	.600
Grove City		–		–	9	–	6	.600
North Dakota Agricultural		–		–	6	–	4	.600
Brown		–		–	11	–	8	.579
Oklahoma		–		–	4	–	3	.571
Auburn		–		–	5	–	5	.500
Butler		–		–	4	–	4	.500
Colorado		–		–	6	–	6	.500
Georgia		–		–	2	–	2	.500
Idaho		–		–	4	–	4	.500
Maine		–		–	5	–	5	.500
Navy		–		–	2	–	2	.500
Niagara		–		–	6	–	6	.500
Rhode Island A&M		–		–	8	–	8	.500
Southern California		–		–	3	–	3	.500
Virginia		–		–	5	–	5	.500
Wisconsin–Stevens Point		–		–	4	–	4	.500
Colgate		–		–	8	–	9	.471
Oregon		–		–	8	–	9	.471
Delaware		–		–	5	–	6	.455
Kentucky		–		–	5	–	6	.455
Ohio State		–		–	5	–	6	.455
Akron		–		–	4	–	5	.444
Manhattan		–		–	7	–	9	.438
Colorado Agricultural		–		–	2	–	3	.400
Connecticut		–		–	6	–	9	.400
Oklahoma A&M		–		–	2	–	3	.400
Westminster (Pa.)		–		–	6	–	9	.400
Fairmount		–		–	2	–	3	.400
Wyoming		–		–	2	–	3	.400
Vanderbilt		–		–	6	–	10	.375
Arizona		–		–	1	–	2	.333
Denver		–		–	1	–	2	.333
St. John's (NY)		–		–	4	–	8	.333
West Virginia		–		–	3	–	7	.300
Lake Forest		–		–	3	–	8	.273
Bloomsburg		–		–	3	–	9	.250
Harvard		–		–	4	–	12	.250
Indiana State		–		–	2	–	6	.250
William & Mary		–		–	1	–	4	.200
Trinity (Conn.)		–		–	2	–	10	.167
Union (N.Y.)		–		–	2	–	10	.167
Miami (Ohio)		–		–	1	–	7	.125
Kansas State		–		–	1	–	12	.077
New Mexico A&M		–		–	0	–	1	.000
Utah State		–		–	0	–	8	.000
Widener		–		–	0	–	2	.000

The 1907–08 Holy Cross Crusaders men's basketball team represented The College of the Holy Cross during the 1907–08 college men's basketball men's basketball season. The head coach was J. Fred Powers, coaching the Crusaders in his sixth season.

== Schedule ==
Date time, TV	Opponent	Result	Record	Site city, state
12/11/1907*	Norwich	W 35–12	1–0	Worcester, MA
1/08/1908*	Massachusetts	W 51–04	2–0	Worcester, MA
1/13/1908*	at Harvard	W 20–16	3–0	Boston, MA
1/16/1908*	Fordham	W 36–21	4–0	Worcester, MA
1/18/1908*	Trinity	W 23–10	5–0	Worcester, MA
1/23/1908*	Dartmouth	L 20–31 ^{ot}	6–0	Hanover, NH
1/29/1908*	Worcester Tech	W 25–23	7–0	Worcester, MA
2/01/1908*	at Andover	L 21–30	7–1	South Portland, ME
2/05/1908*	at Connecticut	W 38–05	8–1	Storrs, CT
2/07/1908*	at Norwich	L 23–24	8–2	Northfield, VT
2/08/1908*	at Dartmouth	L 18–24	8–3	Hanover, NH
2/12/1908*	Harvard	W 17–14	9–3	Worcester, MA
2/21/1908*	at Massachusetts	W 16–07	10–3	Amherst, MA
2/22/1908*	at Fordham	L 8–14	10–4	Bronx, NY
2/26/1908*	M.I.T.	W 26–18 ^{(3 OT)}	11–4	Worcester, MA
2/29/1908*	at Williams	L 21–30	11–5	Williamstown, MA
3/04/1908*	at M.I.T.	L 11–29	11–6	
3/11/1908*	Worcester Tech	W 35–10	12–6	Worcester, MA
*Non-conference game. (#) Tournament seedings in parentheses.
