= 1907–08 Cincinnati Bearcats men's basketball team =

American college basketball season

1907–08 Cincinnati Bearcats men's basketball

Ohio Collegiate Champions
- Conference: Independent
- Record: 9–0
- Head coach: Amos Foster (4th season)
- Captain: Norman Conway
- Home arena: Schmidlapp Gymnasium

The 1907–08 Cincinnati Bearcats men's basketball team represented the University of Cincinnati during the 1907–08 college men's basketball season. The head coach was Amos Foster, coaching his fourth season with the Bearcats.

== Schedule ==
Date time, TV	Opponent	Result	Record	Site city, state
December 20	Miami (OH)	W 43–15	1–0	Schmidlapp Gymnasium; Cincinnati, OH
February 1	at Miami (OH)	W 29–19	2–0	Oxford, OH
February 5	at Wilmington	W 28–27	3–0	Wilmington, OH
February 6	at Parkersburg (WV) YMCA	W 29–17	4–0	Parkersburg, WV
February 7	at Marietta	W 15–12	5–0	Marietta, OH
February 8	at Ohio	W 20–09	6–0	Ewing Hall; Athens, OH
February 13	Ohio	W 49–10	7–0	Schmidlapp Gymnasium; Cincinnati, OH
February 27	Wilmington	W 35–17	8–0	Schmidlapp Gymnasium; Cincinnati, OH
March 6	Denison	W 27–19	9–0	Schmidlapp Gymnasium; Cincinnati, OH
*Non-conference game. (#) Tournament seedings in parentheses.
