= Colorado Mines Orediggers =

Athletic teams of the Colorado School of Mines

- University: Colorado School of Mines
- Conference: RMAC
- NCAA: Division II
- Athletic director: David Hansburg
- Location: Golden, Colorado
- Varsity teams: 16 (9 men's, 7 women's)
- Football stadium: Alumni Field at Marv Kay Stadium
- Basketball arena: Lockridge Arena
- Baseball stadium: Jim Darden Field
- Soccer stadium: Stermole Stadium
- Mascot: Blaster the Burro and Marvin the Miner
- Nickname: Orediggers
- Colors: Silver and blue
- Website: minesathletics.com
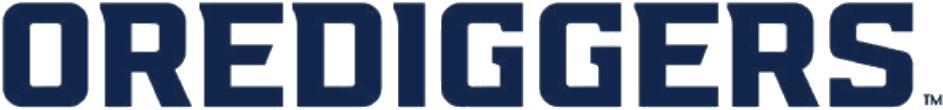

The Colorado Mines Orediggers (also Mines Orediggers) are the athletic teams that represent the Colorado School of Mines, located in Golden, Colorado, in NCAA Division II intercollegiate sports. The Orediggers compete as members of the Rocky Mountain Athletic Conference for all 16 varsity sports.

== Varsity sports ==
The Colorado School of Mines has also been successful athletically as of late. The Orediggers claimed the institution's first-ever Rocky Mountain Athletic Conference (RMAC) All-Sports Cup during the 2011–12 academic year, and repeated in 2015–16. The 2015–16 season saw Mines win their first NCAA team championship (men's cross country) while claiming five RMAC regular-season and three RMAC Tournament titles.

=== Teams ===
Men's sports

- Baseball
- Basketball
- Cross country
- Football
- Golf
- Soccer
- Swimming & diving
- Indoor / outdoor track & field
- Wrestling

Women's sports

- Basketball
- Cross country
- Soccer
- Softball
- Swimming & diving
- Indoor / outdoor track & field
- Volleyball

=== Basketball ===
In 2012, the men's basketball team was ranked No. 1 and made it to the round of 16 where there they were knocked out by Metropolitan State.

=== Cross country ===
The men's cross country team placed 2nd at the 2012 NCAA Division II championships; finishing with 5 all-Americans.

In 2015, the men's cross country won the NCAA DII cross country national championship and brought home 4 all-American awards. It was not only the team's first national title but also first team national title in school history.

The men's team won the 2019 NCAA DII national championship, its second national title. The women’s team also had its highest-ever finish at 3rd place. The men had six out of seven runners receive all-American honors while the women had three all-Americans.

The men's team again won the 2022 NCAA DII national championship, its third national title in eight years, led by individual winner Dillon Powell, the first runner in program history to win individual gold. The team posted the largest margin of victory in meet history with a 143-point win over runner-up Wingate. The women’s team again tied its highest-ever finish at 3rd place. For the first time in program history, all seven Mines' men earned all-American honors while the women also had three all-Americans, matching the 2019 record total.

In 2024, the men’s team won its fourth title, upsetting heavily favored Wingate by just 3 points. On the men’s side, six out of seven runners received All-American honors, and the women had an All-American as well.

=== Football ===
Gregg Brandon, the head coach since 2015, has led the team to winning seasons since taking the reins. Under his leadership, the team was Rocky Mountain Athletic Conference co-champions in 2016 and progressed to the second round of the NCAA playoffs. The preceding head coach from 2000–2015, Bob Stitt, led the team to many wins.

Stitt is the football coach with the most wins at Mines with an offense that was consistently nationally recognized. Under Stitt, the football team was the RMAC champions in 2004 and co-champions in 2010 and 2014, and progressed to the second round of the NCAA playoffs in 2004.

=== Volleyball ===
In women's athletics, the Orediggers have clinched three consecutive RMAC volleyball championships, qualified for the NCAA tournament six years straight and have consistently been ranked in the top 25 in NCAA Division II. The 2014 team finished with a record of 25–4, finishing 10th in the country, and producing two All-Americans and one Honorable Mention All-American.

== National championships ==
=== Team ===
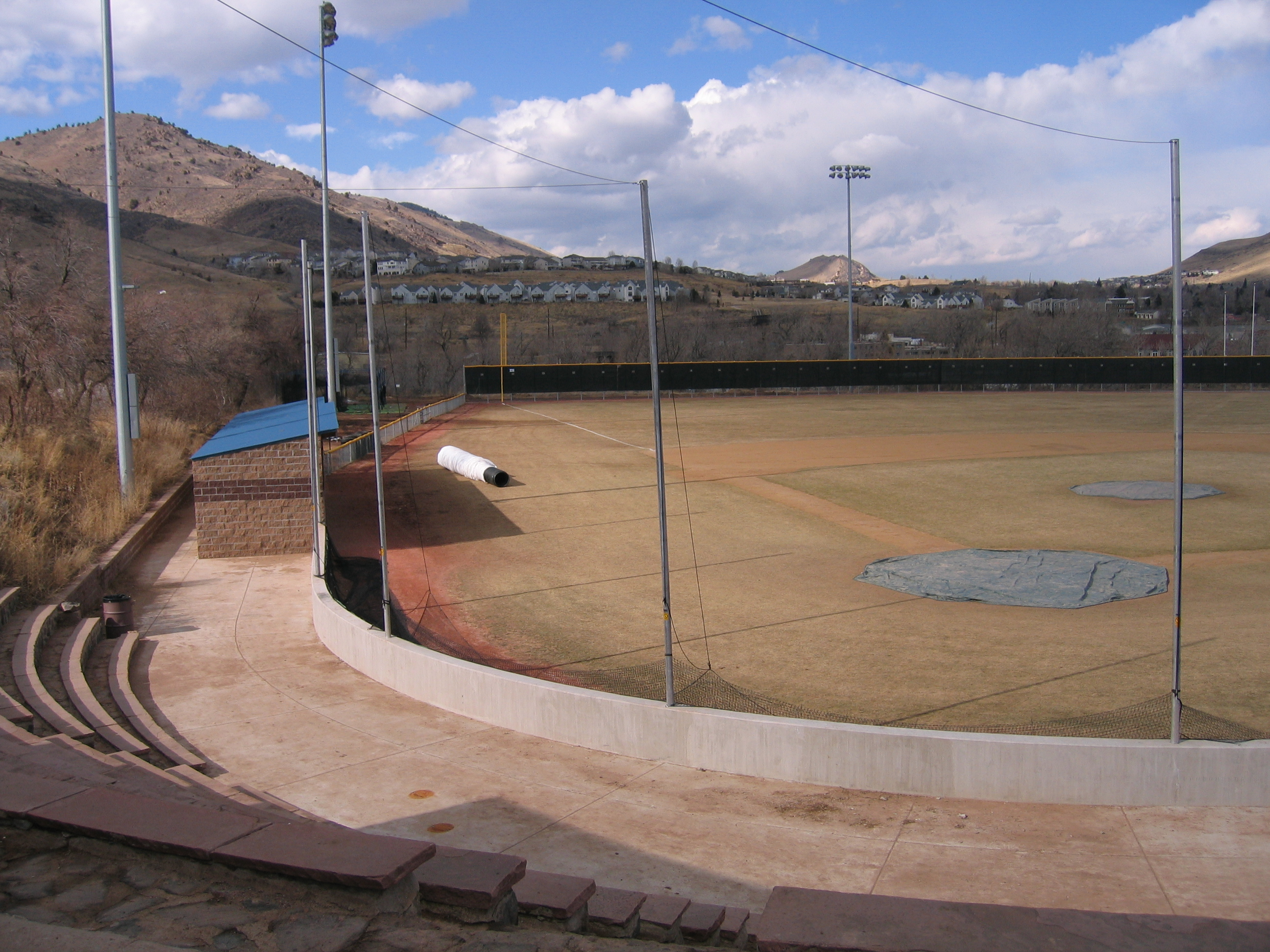
Darden Field, baseball venue

Sport	Association	Division	Year	Opponent/Runner-up	Score
Men's cross country (4)	NCAA	Division II	2015	Adams State	100–127 (-27)
Men's cross country (4)	NCAA	Division II	2019	Adams State	57–136 (-79)
Men's cross country (4)	NCAA	Division II	2022	Wingate	43-177 (-143)
Men's cross country (4)	NCAA	Division II	2024	Wingate	63–66 (–3)
