= Brigham Young College =

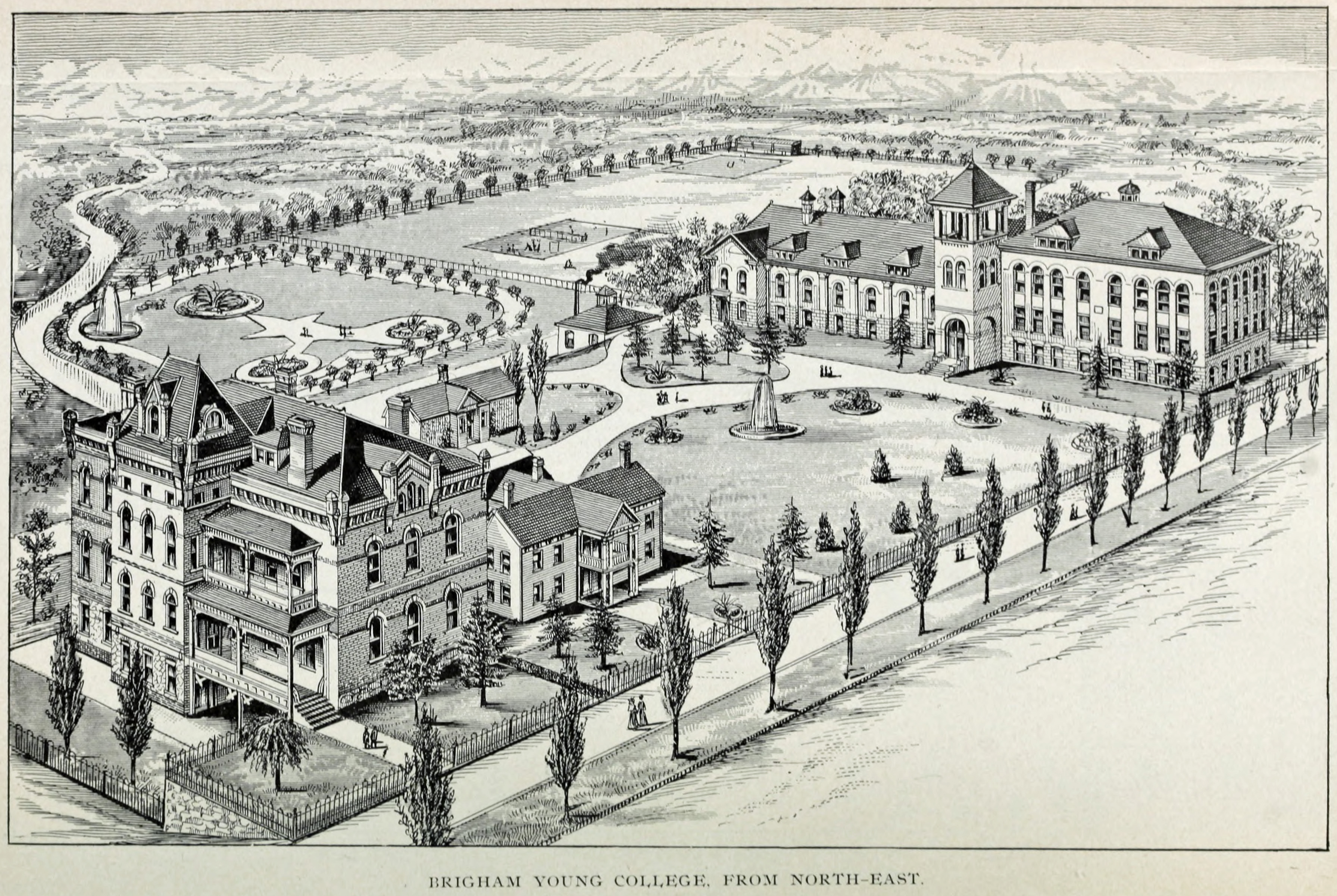
- Artistic rendering of the school's campus, circa 1899. The school's "East Building" is at the left and the "West Building" at the right.
- Active: 1877–1926
- Founder: Brigham Young
- Religious affiliation: The Church of Jesus Christ of Latter-day Saints
- Location: Logan, Utah, U.S. 41.729°N 111.84°W
- Colors: Crimson
- Nickname: Crimsons

Brigham Young College (BYC) was a college and high school in Logan, Utah. It was founded by Brigham Young on August 6, 1877, 23 days before his death. He deeded several acres of land to a board of trustees for the development of a college. This was just two years after he founded Brigham Young Academy (now Brigham Young University) in Provo.

== History ==
Brigham Young established the college to provide higher education to the youth of the Church of Jesus Christ of Latter-day Saints (LDS Church) in northern Utah, southern Idaho, and western Wyoming. It was intended to operate similarly to Oberlin College—the students' work would support the college and their needs—but the plan was never fully worked out. Classes started on September 9, 1878; they met in Lindquist Hall and also for a time in the basement of the Cache Tabernacle.

Brigham Young College had nearly 40,000 students in the period of its operation. Initially it was for preparing teachers (1877–1894), then offered college courses and for fifteen years (1894–1909) granted bachelor's degrees. After 1909, it operated as a high school and junior college.

== Closure ==
In 1926, the Board of Education of the LDS Church's Church Educational System decided to discontinue BYC. Most of school's buildings were sold to the city of Logan and were used by Logan High School. However, BYC's East Building was retained by the church and remodeled into a seminary for the high school's LDS students. Damage from the 1934 Hansel Valley earthquake resulted in this building being demolished and replaced with a new seminary structure in 1937.

Over the subsequent decades, the other historic BYC campus buildings were razed. The Mechanic Arts Building was significantly remodeled into a meeting space by the local chapter of the Benevolent and Protective Order of Elks in the mid-1950s and destroyed by fire in 1962. The laboratory building (then serving as the Daughters of Utah Pioneers museum) was demolished in March 1962. In August 1962, the Cache Valley earthquake occurred nearby. In June 1966, BYC's old West Building (known at that time as the main building of the high school) was demolished, and Nibley Hall was torn down in June 1968.

After BYC's closure, its library collection was given to Utah Agricultural College (now Utah State University (USU)), also in Logan. The BYC Alumni Association also donated its historical collection to USU in 1968.

== Athletics ==
The athletic teams of BYC were known as the Crimsons.

== Notable graduates ==
- Melvin J. Ballard
- Albert E. Bowen
- Hugh B. Brown
- Marriner Stoddard Eccles
- Richard R. Lyman
- John A. Widtsoe
