= Baker Wildcats =

Sports teams of Baker University, Kansas

- University: Baker University
- Nickname: Baker Wildcats
- NAIA: Division I
- Conference: HAAC (primary)
- Athletic director: Susan Decker
- Location: Baldwin City, Kansas
- Varsity teams: 23
- Football stadium: Liston Stadium
- Arena: Collins Gymnasium
- Baseball stadium: Sauder Field
- Softball stadium: Cavaness Field
- Soccer stadium: Hartley Field
- Other venues: Alvamar Golf Course; Laury Tennis Courts; Mabee Memorial Hall
- Colors: Blue and orange
- Mascot: WOWzer the Wildcat
- Fight song: Baker University Fight Song
- Cheer: "The Clap Chant"
- Website: bakerwildcats.com

The Baker Wildcats are the athletic teams that represent Baker University, located in Baldwin City, Kansas, in intercollegiate sports as a member of the National Association of Intercollegiate Athletics (NAIA), primarily competing as a founding member of the Heart of America Athletic Conference (HAAC) since its inception in the 1971–72 academic year. The Wildcats previously competed in the Kansas Collegiate Athletic Conference (KCAC) from 1902–03 to 1970–71.

== Varsity teams ==
Baker competes in 23 intercollegiate varsity sports: Men's sports include baseball, basketball, bowling, cross country, football, golf, soccer, tennis, track & field and wrestling; while women's sports include basketball, bowling, cross country, golf, soccer, softball, tennis, track & field, volleyball and wrestling; and co-ed sports includes cheerleading, dance and eSports.

=== Baseball ===
The Wildcat baseball team won the 1993 HAAC championship. The program boasts wins against all three of Kansas's NCAA Division I baseball teams. Its most recent success came against Kansas, when the Wildcats beat the Jayhawks three times from 1998 to 2003, including back-to-back meetings in 1998 and 1999; the 7-4 victory in 2003 came during the Jayhawks' first season under head coach Ritch Price, who went on to lead Kansas to three NCAA tournaments in a 20-season tenure. Baker last defeated Kansas State on K-State's opening day in 1980. (At the time, K-State was led by third-year head coach Dave Baker.) Baker's most even series overall is against Wichita State (who leads 12-7 all-time), but Baker has not defeated the Shockers since 1916.

== Colors ==
They have only one official color: cadmium orange. The only other school in the country to have orange as their only official color is Syracuse University.

== Facilities ==
- Alvamar Golf Course: Golf
- Cavaness Field: Softball
- Collins Gymnasium: Basketball, volleyball, and wrestling
- Laury Tennis Courts: Tennis
- Liston Stadium: Football, track, and select soccer matches
- Mabee Memorial Hall: Practice facilities (basketball), Cheer, Athletic offices
- North Park: Baseball

== Mascot ==
The official mascot of Baker University Athletic teams is WOWzer the Wildcat. WOWZer debuted, as the new mascot, on September 8, 2007, at the football home-opener in honor of the university's sesquicentennial. Reina Murphy, a freshman from the Kansas City metropolitan area, won the university's name the Wildcat contest.

== Notable alumni ==
- Mike Gardner, American football head coach
- George LaFrance, American football player
- Mike McCarthy, American football head coach
- Vidal Nuño, baseball player
- Tanner Purdum, American football player
- Blake Treinen, baseball player

== Notable coaches ==
- Phog Allen, basketball coach at Baker University, the University of Central Missouri and the University of Kansas
- Emil Liston basketball coach (1930–1945) and administrator, inductee to Basketball Hall of Fame, and creator of the NAIA college basketball tournament
- Charlie Richard, inducted into the College Football Hall of Fame

== See also ==
- 1890 Kansas vs. Baker football game, the first college football game played in the state of Kansas.
