= 1906–07 IAAUS men's basketball season =

Men's collegiate basketball season

- Helms National Champions: Chicago (retroactive selection in 1943)
- Player of the Year (Helms): Gilmore Kinney, Yale (retroactive selection in 1944)

The 1906–07 IAAUS men's basketball season began in December 1906, progressed through the regular season, and concluded in March 1907.

== Rule changes ==
- The free-throw line, which had been at 20 feet (6.1 m) since 1894, is moved to 15 feet (4.6 m).

== Season headlines ==
- The 1906–07 season was the first to be played after the founding of the Intercollegiate Athletic Association of the United States (IAAUS), which renamed itself the National Collegiate Athletic Association (NCAA) in 1910.
- In February 1943, the Helms Athletic Foundation retroactively selected Chicago as its national champion for the 1906–07 season.
- In 2009, the Premo-Porretta Power Poll retroactively selected Williams as its top-ranked team for the 1906–07 season.
- The 1906–07 Army Cadets men's basketball team represented United States Military Academy during the 1906–07 college men's basketball season. The head coach was Harry Fisher, coaching his first season with the Cadets. The team captain was Lewis Rockwell.

== Conference membership changes ==
School	Former Conference	New Conference
Georgetown Hoyas	No basketball team	Independent
Northwestern Wildcats	No major basketball program	Western Conference

== Regular season ==
=== Conferences ===
Conference	Regular Season Winner	Conference Player of the Year	Conference Tournament	Tournament Venue (City)	Tournament Winner
Eastern Intercollegiate Basketball League	Yale	None selected	No Tournament		
Western Conference	Chicago, Minnesota, & Wisconsin	None selected	No Tournament		

1906–07 Eastern Intercollegiate Basketball League standings
	Conf.				Overall
Team	W		L	PCT	W		L	PCT
Yale	9	–	1	.900	30	–	7	.811
Columbia	8	–	2	.800	11	–	2	.846
Penn	6	–	4	.600	15	–	8	.652
Harvard	4	–	6	.400	7	–	9	.438
Princeton	2	–	8	.200	4	–	10	.286
Cornell	1	–	9	.100	1	–	11	.083

1906–07 Western Conference men's basketball standings
	Conf.				Overall
Team	W		L	PCT	W		L	PCT
Chicago	6	–	2	.750	21	–	2	.913
Minnesota	6	–	2	.750	10	–	2	.833
Wisconsin	6	–	2	.750	11	–	3	.786
Purdue	2	–	6	.250	7	–	8	.467
Illinois	0	–	8	.000	1	–	10	.091
Indiana	-	–	-	–	9	–	5	.643
Iowa	-	–	-	–	5	–	5	.500
Northwestern	-	–	-	–	1	–	5	.167

=== Independents ===
A total of 93 college teams played as major independents. Among independents that played 10 or more games, Baker (14–0) and Dayton (14–0) went undefeated and Oregon Agricultural (17–1) and Wabash (17–2) finished with the most wins.

1906–07 IAAUS men's basketball independents standings
	Conf.				Overall
Team	W		L	PCT	W		L	PCT
Baker		–		–	14	–	0	1.000
Concordia Seminary		–		–	5	–	0	1.000
Dayton		–		–	14	–	0	1.000
Georgia		–		–	2	–	0	1.000
North Dakota		–		–	7	–	0	1.000
Rhode Island		–		–	5	–	0	1.000
Wake Forest		–		–	4	–	0	1.000
Oregon Agricultural		–		–	17	–	1	.944
Williams		–		–	15	–	1	.938
North Dakota State		–		–	11	–	1	.917
Allegheny		–		–	10	–	1	.909
Bucknell		–		–	10	–	1	.909
Wabash		–		–	17	–	2	.895
CCNY		–		–	8	–	1	.889
Michigan State		–		–	14	–	2	.875
Westminster (Pa.)		–		–	7	–	1	.875
Vanderbilt		–		–	6	–	1	.857
Wisconsin–Stevens Point		–		–	6	–	1	.857
Grinnell		–		–	9	–	2	.818
Lehigh		–		–	9	–	2	.818
Cincinnati		–		–	7	–	2	.778
Dartmouth		–		–	13	–	4	.765
Arizona		–		–	3	–	1	.750
Buffalo		–		–	6	–	2	.750
Lake Forest		–		–	6	–	2	.750
New York University		–		–	6	–	2	.750
Akron		–		–	5	–	2	.714
Brigham Young		–		–	7	–	3	.700
Canisius		–		–	9	–	4	.692
Auburn		–		–	4	–	2	.667
Drake		–		–	2	–	1	.667
Trinity (N.C.)		–		–	3	–	2	.600
Montana State		–		–	4	–	2	.667
Washburn		–		–	10	–	5	.667
Widener		–		–	6	–	3	.667
Wooster		–		–	8	–	4	.667
Southwestern (Kan.)		–		–	13	–	7	.650
Army		–		–	9	–	5	.643
Colgate		–		–	9	–	5	.643
Denison		–		–	9	–	5	.643
Fordham		–		–	16	–	9	.640
Maine		–		–	7	–	4	.636
Colorado Agricultural		–		–	5	–	3	.625
Illinois State		–		–	5	–	3	.625
Missouri		–		–	10	–	6	.625
Nebraska		–		–	10	–	6	.625
Virginia		–		–	5	–	3	.625
Colorado		–		–	6	–	4	.600
Washington (Mo.)		–		–	6	–	4	.600
Brown		–		–	10	–	7	.588
Ohio State		–		–	7	–	5	.583
Muhlenberg		–		–	4	–	3	.571
Oregon		–		–	4	–	3	.571
Syracuse		–		–	4	–	3	.571
Temple		–		–	5	–	4	.556
Washington State		–		–	5	–	4	.556
Delaware		–		–	6	–	5	.545
Grove City		–		–	6	–	5	.545
Pittsburgh		–		–	6	–	5	.545
USC		–		–	6	–	5	.545
Bradley		–		–	7	–	6	.538
Georgetown		–		–	2	–	2	.500
Gettysburg		–		–	3	–	3	.500
Idaho		–		–	3	–	3	.500
Mount Union		–		–	7	–	7	.500
Nebraska Wesleyan		–		–	5	–	5	.500
New Mexico		–		–	1	–	1	.500
Niagara		–		–	5	–	5	.500
Texas		–		–	4	–	4	.500
Wesleyan (Conn.)		–		–	9	–	9	.500
Kansas		–		–	7	–	8	.467
Baylor		–		–	5	–	6	.455
Kansas State		–		–	5	–	6	.455
Penn State		–		–	5	–	6	.455
Trinity (Conn.)		–		–	5	–	6	.455
Bloomsburg		–		–	6	–	8	.429
Union (N.Y.)		–		–	6	–	8	.429
Wyoming		–		–	3	–	4	.429
Connecticut		–		–	5	–	7	.417
Denver		–		–	7	–	10	.412
Butler		–		–	2	–	4	.333
Kentucky		–		–	3	–	6	.333
Miami (Ohio)		–		–	2	–	4	.333
West Virginia		–		–	4	–	8	.333
Fairmount		–		–	3	–	6	.333
Utah State		–		–	2	–	6	.250
Manhattan		–		–	2	–	7	.222
Tulane		–		–	2	–	8	.200
Washington and Lee		–		–	2	–	8	.200
William & Mary		–		–	1	–	4	.200
Indiana State		–		–	1	–	8	.111
Franklin (Ind.)		–		–	0	–	1	.000
New Mexico A&M		–		–	0	–	1	.000

== Awards ==
=== Helms College Basketball All-Americans ===
The practice of selecting a Consensus All-American Team did not begin until the 1928–29 season. The Helms Athletic Foundation later retroactively selected a list of All-Americans for the 1906–07 season.

Player	Team
Frank Arthur	Wisconsin
George Flint	Penn
Albert Houghton	Chicago
Marcus Hurley	Columbia
Charles Keinath	Penn
Gilmore Kinney	Yale
John Ryan	Columbia
John Schommer	Chicago
Oswald Tower	Williams
L. Parson Warren	Williams

=== Major player of the year awards ===
- Helms Player of the Year: Gilmore Kinney, Yale (retroactive selection in 1944)

== Coaching changes ==
A number of teams changed coaches during the season and after it ended.

Team	Former Coach	Interim Coach	New Coach	Reason
Army	Harry A. Fisher		Joseph Stilwell	
Brown	W. W. Reynolds		J. Donald Pryor	
Butler	Art Guedel		Jack McKay	
Canisius	J. P. Quinlisk		John Mahoney	
Drexel	W. S. Brokaw		F. Bennett	
Fordham	Frank O'Donnell		Chris Mahoney	
Georgetown	No coach		Maurice Joyce	After having no coach during its initial season (1906–07) and relying on an elected student manager to run the team, Georgetown hired Joyce for the 1907–08 season as its first coach.
Georgia	Walter Forbes		C. O. Heildler	
Idaho	John G. Griffith		George Wyman	
Illinois	Frank L. Pinckney		Fletcher Lan	
Indiana	James M. Sheldon		Ed Cook	
Iowa	John G. Griffith		Ed Rule	
Kansas	James Naismith		Phog Allen	Future Hall of Famer Allen launched his coaching career, taking over from the sport's founder Naismith.
Miami (Ohio)	John Snyder		C. H. Martin	
Missouri	Isadore Anderson		A. M. Ebright	
Montana	Frederick Schule		Albion Findlay	
Oregon	Hugo Bezdek		Charles Murphy	
Oregon Agricultural	W. O. Trine		Roy Heater	
Pittsburgh	Benjamin Printz		Harry Hough	
Princeton	William Kelleher		C. F. Kogel	
South Dakota State	William Juneau		Jason M. Saunderson	
Utah State	George P. Campbell		Mysterious Walker	
Vanderbilt	Stein Stone		W. L. Throop	
Washington State	Everett Sweeley		John R. Bender	
West Virginia	Anthony Chez		James Jenkins	
William & Mary	H. W. Withers		F. M. Crawford	
