= 1906–07 Butler Christians men's basketball team =

American college basketball season

1906–07 Butler Bulldogs men's basketball
- Conference: Independent
- Record: 2–4
- Head coach: Art Guedel (1st season)

1906–07 IAAUS men's basketball independents standings
	Conf.				Overall
Team	W		L	PCT	W		L	PCT
Baker		–		–	14	–	0	1.000
Concordia Seminary		–		–	5	–	0	1.000
Dayton		–		–	14	–	0	1.000
Georgia		–		–	2	–	0	1.000
North Dakota		–		–	7	–	0	1.000
Rhode Island		–		–	5	–	0	1.000
Wake Forest		–		–	4	–	0	1.000
Oregon Agricultural		–		–	17	–	1	.944
Williams		–		–	15	–	1	.938
North Dakota State		–		–	11	–	1	.917
Allegheny		–		–	10	–	1	.909
Bucknell		–		–	10	–	1	.909
Wabash		–		–	17	–	2	.895
CCNY		–		–	8	–	1	.889
Michigan State		–		–	14	–	2	.875
Westminster (Pa.)		–		–	7	–	1	.875
Vanderbilt		–		–	6	–	1	.857
Wisconsin–Stevens Point		–		–	6	–	1	.857
Grinnell		–		–	9	–	2	.818
Lehigh		–		–	9	–	2	.818
Cincinnati		–		–	7	–	2	.778
Dartmouth		–		–	13	–	4	.765
Arizona		–		–	3	–	1	.750
Buffalo		–		–	6	–	2	.750
Lake Forest		–		–	6	–	2	.750
New York University		–		–	6	–	2	.750
Akron		–		–	5	–	2	.714
Brigham Young		–		–	7	–	3	.700
Canisius		–		–	9	–	4	.692
Auburn		–		–	4	–	2	.667
Drake		–		–	2	–	1	.667
Trinity (N.C.)		–		–	3	–	2	.600
Montana State		–		–	4	–	2	.667
Washburn		–		–	10	–	5	.667
Widener		–		–	6	–	3	.667
Wooster		–		–	8	–	4	.667
Southwestern (Kan.)		–		–	13	–	7	.650
Army		–		–	9	–	5	.643
Colgate		–		–	9	–	5	.643
Denison		–		–	9	–	5	.643
Fordham		–		–	16	–	9	.640
Maine		–		–	7	–	4	.636
Colorado Agricultural		–		–	5	–	3	.625
Illinois State		–		–	5	–	3	.625
Missouri		–		–	10	–	6	.625
Nebraska		–		–	10	–	6	.625
Virginia		–		–	5	–	3	.625
Colorado		–		–	6	–	4	.600
Washington (Mo.)		–		–	6	–	4	.600
Brown		–		–	10	–	7	.588
Ohio State		–		–	7	–	5	.583
Muhlenberg		–		–	4	–	3	.571
Oregon		–		–	4	–	3	.571
Syracuse		–		–	4	–	3	.571
Temple		–		–	5	–	4	.556
Washington State		–		–	5	–	4	.556
Delaware		–		–	6	–	5	.545
Grove City		–		–	6	–	5	.545
Pittsburgh		–		–	6	–	5	.545
USC		–		–	6	–	5	.545
Bradley		–		–	7	–	6	.538
Georgetown		–		–	2	–	2	.500
Gettysburg		–		–	3	–	3	.500
Idaho		–		–	3	–	3	.500
Mount Union		–		–	7	–	7	.500
Nebraska Wesleyan		–		–	5	–	5	.500
New Mexico		–		–	1	–	1	.500
Niagara		–		–	5	–	5	.500
Texas		–		–	4	–	4	.500
Wesleyan (Conn.)		–		–	9	–	9	.500
Kansas		–		–	7	–	8	.467
Baylor		–		–	5	–	6	.455
Kansas State		–		–	5	–	6	.455
Penn State		–		–	5	–	6	.455
Trinity (Conn.)		–		–	5	–	6	.455
Bloomsburg		–		–	6	–	8	.429
Union (N.Y.)		–		–	6	–	8	.429
Wyoming		–		–	3	–	4	.429
Connecticut		–		–	5	–	7	.417
Denver		–		–	7	–	10	.412
Butler		–		–	2	–	4	.333
Kentucky		–		–	3	–	6	.333
Miami (Ohio)		–		–	2	–	4	.333
West Virginia		–		–	4	–	8	.333
Fairmount		–		–	3	–	6	.333
Utah State		–		–	2	–	6	.250
Manhattan		–		–	2	–	7	.222
Tulane		–		–	2	–	8	.200
Washington and Lee		–		–	2	–	8	.200
William & Mary		–		–	1	–	4	.200
Indiana State		–		–	1	–	8	.111
Franklin (Ind.)		–		–	0	–	1	.000
New Mexico A&M		–		–	0	–	1	.000

The 1906–07 Butler Christians men's basketball team represented Butler University during the 1906–07 college men's basketball season. The head coach was Art Guedel, coaching in his second season with the Christians.

== Schedule ==
Date time, TV	Opponent	Result	Record	Site city, state
*	Purdue Medical School	W 46–8	1–0	Indianapolis, IN
*	DePauw	L 28–43	1–1	Indianapolis, IN
January 19*	at Indiana State Normal	W 23–20	2–1	North Hall; Terre Haute, IN
February 11*	Indiana	L 17–30	2–2	Indianapolis, IN
February 23*	at Indiana	L 7–46	2–3	Old Assembly Hall; Bloomington, IN
*	Earlham	L 13–33	2–4	Indianapolis, IN
*Non-conference game. (#) Tournament seedings in parentheses.
