= List of Missouri Tigers men's basketball seasons =

This is a list of seasons completed by the Missouri Tigers men's college basketball team.

== Seasons ==
Record table
Season	Coach	Overall	Conference	Standing	Postseason
Isadore Anderson (Independent) (1906–1907)
1906–07	Isadore Anderson	10–6			
A.M. Ebright (Missouri Valley) (1907–1908)
1907–08	A. M. Ebright	8–10	0–8	3rd (South)	
Guy Lowman (Missouri Valley) (1908–1910)
1908–09	Guy Lowman	10–5	4–5	T–2nd (South)	
1909–10	Guy Lowman	8–11	3–7	3rd (South)	
Chester Brewer (Missouri Valley) (1910–1911)
1910–11	Chester Brewer	5–7	5–7	4th	
Osmond F. Field (Missouri Valley) (1911–1914)
1911–12	Osmond F. Field	5–10	4–9	3rd (South)	
1912–13	Osmond F. Field	13–5	9–3	2nd (South)	
1913–14	Osmond F. Field	4–12	4–12	4th (South)	
Eugene Van Gent (Missouri Valley) (1914–1916)
1914–15	Eugene Van Gent	8–6	6–6	3rd	
1915–16	Eugene Van Gent	12–3	9–2	2nd	
John F. Miller (Missouri Valley) (1916–1917)
1916–17	John F. Miller	12–4	10–4	2nd	
Walter Meanwell (Missouri Valley) (1917–1918)
1917–18	Walter Meanwell	17–1	15–1	1st	
John F. Miller (Missouri Valley) (1918–1919)
1918–19	John F. Miller	14–3	11–3	2nd	
Walter Meanwell (Missouri Valley) (1919–1920)
1919–20	Walter Meanwell	17–1	17–1	1st	
Craig Ruby (Missouri Valley) (1920–1922)
1920–21	Craig Ruby	17–1	17–1	1st	
1921–22	Craig Ruby	16–1	15–1	T–1st	
George Bond (Missouri Valley) (1922–1926)
1922–23	George Bond	15–3	14–2	2nd	
1923–24	George Bond	4–14	4–12	T–7th	
1924–25	George Bond	7–11	6–10	6th	
1925–26	George Bond	8–10	8–8	4th	
George Edwards (Missouri Valley) (1926–1928)
1926–27	George Edwards	9–8	6–4	3rd	
1927–28	George Edwards	9–8	6–4	3rd	
George Edwards (Big Six) (1928–1946)
1928–29	George Edwards	11–7	6–10	6th	
1929–30	George Edwards	15–3	8–2	1st	
1930–31	George Edwards	8–9	5–5	T–3rd	
1931–32	George Edwards	9–9	6–4	T–2nd	
1932–33	George Edwards	10–8	6–4	3rd	
1933–34	George Edwards	10–8	6–4	T–2nd	
1934–35	George Edwards	7–11	7–9	4th	
1935–36	George Edwards	5–12	2–8	6th	
1936–37	George Edwards	7–9	2–8	5th	
1937–38	George Edwards	9–9	4–6	T–3rd	
1938–39	George Edwards	12–6	7–3	T–1st	
1939–40	George Edwards	13–6	8–2	T–1st	
1940–41	George Edwards	6–10	2–8	6th	
1941–42	George Edwards	6–12	2–8	6th	
1942–43	George Edwards	7–10	5–5	T–3rd	
1943–44	George Edwards	10–9	5–5	T–3rd	NCAA Elite Eight
1944–45	George Edwards	8–10	5–5	T–3rd	
1945–46	George Edwards	6–11	3–7	T–4th	
Wilbur Stalcup (Big Six) (1946–1948)
1946–47	Wilbur Stalcup	15–10	6–4	2nd	
1947–48	Wilbur Stalcup	14–10	7–5	T–2nd	
Wilbur Stalcup (Big Seven) (1948–1958)
1948–49	Wilbur Stalcup	11–13	6–6	4th	
1949–50	Wilbur Stalcup	14–10	6–8	4th	
1950–51	Wilbur Stalcup	16–8	8–4	T–2nd	
1951–52	Wilbur Stalcup	14–10	6–6	3rd	
1952–53	Wilbur Stalcup	12–9	6–6	3rd	
1953–54	Wilbur Stalcup	11–10	6–6	3rd	
1954–55	Wilbur Stalcup	16–5	9–3	2nd	
1955–56	Wilbur Stalcup	15–7	8–4	T–2nd	
1956–57	Wilbur Stalcup	10–13	4–8	6th	
1957–58	Wilbur Stalcup	9–13	3–9	T–6th	
Wilbur Stalcup (Big Eight) (1958–1962)
1958–59	Wilbur Stalcup	6–19	3–11	8th	
1959–60	Wilbur Stalcup	12–13	5–9	6th	
1960–61	Wilbur Stalcup	9–15	8–6	4th	
1961–62	Wilbur Stalcup	9–16	3–11	T–7th	
Bob Vanatta (Big Eight) (1962–1967)
1962–63	Bob Vanatta	10–15	5–9	T–6th	
1963–64	Bob Vanatta	13–11	7–7	T–4th	
1964–65	Bob Vanatta	13–11	8–6	T–3rd	
1965–66	Bob Vanatta	3–21	1–13	8th	
1966–67	Bob Vanatta	3–22	1–13	8th	
Norm Stewart (Big Eight) (1967–1996)
1967–68	Norm Stewart	10–16	5–9	6th	
1968–69	Norm Stewart	14–11	7–7	5th	
1969–70	Norm Stewart	15–11	7–7	T–3rd	
1970–71	Norm Stewart	17–9	9–5	T–2nd	
1971–72	Norm Stewart	21–6	10–4	2nd	NIT First round
1972–73	Norm Stewart	21–6	9–5	T–2nd	NIT First round
1973–74	Norm Stewart	12–14	3–11	T–7th	
1974–75	Norm Stewart	18–9	9–5	3rd	NCIT First round
1975–76	Norm Stewart	26–5	12–2	1st	NCAA Division I Elite Eight
1976–77	Norm Stewart	21–8	9–5	3rd	
1977–78	Norm Stewart	14–16	4–10	T–6th	NCAA Division I First round
1978–79	Norm Stewart	13–15	8–6	T–2nd	
1979–80	Norm Stewart	25–6	11–3	1st	NCAA Division I Sweet Sixteen
1980–81	Norm Stewart	22–10	10–4	1st	NCAA Division I First round
1981–82	Norm Stewart	27–4	12–2	1st	NCAA Division I Sweet Sixteen
1982–83	Norm Stewart	26–8	12–2	1st	NCAA Division I Second round
1983–84	Norm Stewart	16–14	5–9	T–6th	
1984–85	Norm Stewart	18–14	7–7	T–3rd	NIT First round
1985–86	Norm Stewart	21–14	8–6	T–3rd	NCAA Division I First round
1986–87	Norm Stewart	24–10	11–3	1st	NCAA Division I First round
1987–88	Norm Stewart	19–11	7–7	4th	NCAA Division I First round
1988–89	Norm Stewart	29–8	10–4	2nd	NCAA Division I Sweet Sixteen
1989–90	Norm Stewart	26–6	12–2	1st	NCAA Division I First round
1990–91	Norm Stewart	20–10	8–6	4th	Ineligible
1991–92	Norm Stewart	21–9	8–6	T–2nd	NCAA Division I Second round
1992–93	Norm Stewart	19–14	5–9	7th	NCAA Division I First round
1993–94	Norm Stewart	28–4^{[Note A]}	14–0	1st	NCAA Division I Elite Eight
1994–95	Norm Stewart	20–9	8–6	4th	NCAA Division I Second round
1995–96	Norm Stewart	18–15	6–8	5th	NIT Second round
Norm Stewart (Big 12) (1996–1999)
1996–97	Norm Stewart	16–17	5–11	10th	
1997–98	Norm Stewart	17–15	8–8	T–5th	NIT First round
1998–99	Norm Stewart	20–9	11–5	T–2nd	NCAA Division I First round
Quin Snyder (Big 12) (1999–2006)
1999–00	Quin Snyder	18–13	10–6	6th	NCAA Division I First round
2000–01	Quin Snyder	20–13	9–7	6th	NCAA Division I Second round
2001–02	Quin Snyder	25–11	9–7	6th	NCAA Division I Elite Eight
2002–03	Quin Snyder	22–11	9–7	T–5th	NCAA Division I Second round
2003–04	Quin Snyder	16–14	9–7	5th	NIT First round
2004–05	Quin Snyder	16–17	7–9	T–8th	NIT First round
2005–06	Quin Snyder; Melvin Watkins	12–16	5–11	11th	
Mike Anderson (Big 12) (2006–2011)
2006–07	Mike Anderson	18–12	7–9	6th	
2007–08	Mike Anderson	16–16	6–10	10th	
2008–09	Mike Anderson	31–7	12–4	3rd	NCAA Division I Elite Eight
2009–10	Mike Anderson	23–11	10–6	5th	NCAA Division I Second round
2010–11	Mike Anderson	23–11	8–8	T–5th	NCAA Division I First round
Frank Haith (Big 12) (2011–2012)
2011–12	Frank Haith	30–5	14–4	2nd	NCAA Division I First round
Frank Haith (SEC) (2012–2014)
2012–13	Frank Haith	23–11	11–7	T–5th	NCAA Division I First round
2013–14	Frank Haith; Tim Fuller	23–12^{[Note B]}	9–9	T–6th	NIT Second round
Kim Anderson (SEC) (2014–2017)
2014–15	Kim Anderson	9–23	3–15	14th	
2015–16	Kim Anderson	10–21	3–15	14th	
2016–17	Kim Anderson	8–23	2–16	T–13th	
Cuonzo Martin (SEC) (2017–2022)
2017–18	Cuonzo Martin	20–12	10–8	T–4th	NCAA Division I First round
2018–19	Cuonzo Martin	15–17	5–13	12th	Ineligible
2019–20	Cuonzo Martin	15–16	7–11	T–10th	No postseason held
2020–21	Cuonzo Martin	16–10	8–8	7th	NCAA Division I First round
2021–22	Cuonzo Martin	12–21	5–13	12th	
Dennis Gates (SEC) (2022–present)
2022–23	Dennis Gates	25–10	11–7	T–4th	NCAA Division I Second round
2023–24	Dennis Gates	8–24	0–18	14th	
2024–25	Dennis Gates	22–12	10–8	T–6th	NCAA Division I First Round
2025–26	Dennis Gates	20–13	10–8	T–7th	NCAA Division I First Round
Total:		1750–1263	MVIAA 173–110		
National champion Postseason invitational champion Conference regular season champion Conference regular season and conference tournament champion Division regular season champion Division regular season and conference tournament champion Conference tournament champion

^A.Missouri vacated three tournament wins in 1994.
^B.Missouri vacated all wins from the 2013–2014 season in 2015.
