= 1907 NCAA Men's Basketball All-Americans =

- Awarded for: 1906–07 IAAUS men's basketball season

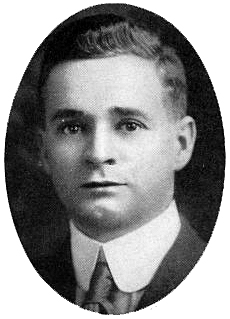
George Flint of Pennsylvania.

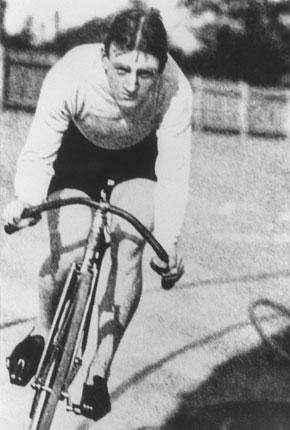
Marcus Hurley of Columbia.

The 1907 College Basketball All-American team, as chosen retroactively by the Helms Athletic Foundation. The player highlighted in gold was chosen as the Helms Foundation College Basketball Player of the Year retroactively in 1944.

Player	Team
Frank Arthur	Wisconsin
George Flint	Penn
Albert Houghton	Chicago
Marcus Hurley	Columbia
Charles Keinath	Penn
Gilmore Kinney	Yale
John Ryan	Columbia
John Schommer	Chicago
Oswald Tower	Williams
L. Parson Warren	Williams

== See also ==
- 1906–07 IAAUS men's basketball season
