= List of Missouri Tigers men's basketball head coaches =

List of Head Coaches

This is a list of Missouri Tigers men's basketball head coaches.

== Coaching records ==
Coach	Years	Seasons	Record	Winning %
Dennis Gates	2022–present	3	55-46	0.545
Cuonzo Martin	2017–2022	5	78-77	0.503
Kim Anderson	2014–17	3	27–68	0.284
Frank Haith	2011–2014	3	53-28	0.654
Mike Anderson	2006-11	5	111-57	0.661
Melvin Watkins	2006	*	2–5	0.286
Quin Snyder	1999–2006	7	126–91	0.580
Norm Stewart	1967–99	32	634–333	0.656
Bob Vanatta	1962–67	5	42–80	0.344
Wilbur Stalcup	1946–62	16	195–179	0.521
George Edwards	1926–46	20	181–172	0.513
George Bond	1922–26	4	34–38	0.472
Craig Ruby	1920–22	2	33–2	0.933
Walter Meanwell	1917–18, 1919–20	2	34–2	0.944
John F. Miller	1916–17, 1918–19	2	26–7	0.788
Eugene Van Gent	1914–16	2	21–9	0.700
Osmond F. Field	1911–14	3	22–27	0.449
Chester Brewer	1910–11	1	5–7	0.417
Guy Lowman	1908–10	2	19–15	0.559
A. M. Ebright	1907–08	1	8–10	0.444
Isadore Anderson	1906–07	1	10–6	0.625

*Watkins served as interim head coach for 7 games following the resignation of Quin Snyder.
