= John Loughran =

John Loughran may refer to:

- John T. Loughran (1889–1953), American judge in New York
- Speedo Loughran (1897–1989), American college football and college basketball player and coach

== See also ==
- John Loughrin (1852–1917), Ontario merchant and political figure
