= 1907–08 Iowa State Cyclones men's basketball team =

American college basketball season

1907–08 Iowa State Cyclones men's basketball
- Conference: MVIAA
- Record: 1–1 (1–0 Missouri Valley)
- Head coach: Clyde Williams (1st season)
- Home arena: Margaret Hall Gym

1907–08 Missouri Valley Intercollegiate Athletic Association men's basketball standings
	Conf.				Overall
Team	W		L	PCT	W		L	PCT
North Division
Nebraska	0	–	0	–	7	–	3	.700
Iowa State	1	–	0	1.000	1	–	1	.500
Drake	0	–	1	.000	1	–	6	.143
South Division
Kansas†	6	–	0	1.000	18	–	6	.750
Washington University	1	–	0	1.000	4	–	2	.667
Missouri	0	–	5	.000	8	–	10	.444
† Conference championship winner

The 1907–08 Iowa State Cyclones men's basketball team was the first ever team representing Iowa State University during the 1907–08 IAAUS men's basketball season. The Cyclones were coached by Clyde Williams, who was in his first season coaching the Cyclones' basketball team. They played their home games for the last time at Margaret Hall Gymnasium in Ames, Iowa. They were also known informally as "Ames" and as the "Aggies".

They finished the season 1–1, 1–0 in Missouri Valley play to finish in second place in the North Division. Despite going 1–0 and Nebraska not having a conference record, Nebraska was still declared the divisional winner due to having a better inter-divisional record.

== Roster ==
1907–08 Iowa State Cyclones men's basketball team
Players
Coaches

Pos.	#	Name	Height	Weight	Year	Hometown
G		Harold Case	—	—		Chicago
		R.S. Fuhrmeiseter	—	—		Cedar Rapids, Iowa
F		Howard Herbert	—	—		Atlantic, Iowa
F		Frederick Law	—	—		Keokuk, Iowa
F		Henry Luberger (C)	—	—	Sr	Cedar Rapids, Iowa
C		Ralph McElhinney	—	—		Waterloo, Iowa
		Starr Thayer	—	—	Sr	Rock Valley, Iowa

Head coach

- Clyde Williams

Assistant coach(es)

Legend

- (C) Team captain
- (S) Suspended
- (I) Ineligible
- (W) Walk-on
- Injured
- Current redshirt

== Schedule and results ==
Date time, TV	Rank^{#}	Opponent^{#}	Result	Record	Site city, state
Regular season
February 20, 1908*		Kansas	L 35–53	0–1	National Guard Armory; Ames, Iowa
February 29, 1908		Drake	W 36–16	1–1 (1–0)	Margaret Hall Gym; Ames, Iowa
*Non-conference game. ^{#}Rankings from AP poll. (#) Tournament seedings in parentheses. All times are in Central Time.
