= 1907–08 Kansas Jayhawks men's basketball team =

American college basketball season

1907–08 Kansas Jayhawks men's basketball

MVIAA Champions
- Conference: MVIAA
- Record: 18–6 (6–0 MVIAA)
- Head coach: Phog Allen (1st season)
- Captain: George McCune
- Home arena: Robinson Gymnasium

1907–08 Missouri Valley Intercollegiate Athletic Association men's basketball standings
| | Conf. | | | | Overall |
| Team | W | | L | PCT | W | | L | PCT |
|---|---|---|---|---|---|---|---|---|
North Division
| Nebraska | 0 | – | 0 | – | 7 | – | 3 | .700 |
| Iowa State | 1 | – | 0 | 1.000 | 1 | – | 1 | .500 |
| Drake | 0 | – | 1 | .000 | 1 | – | 6 | .143 |
South Division
| Kansas† | 6 | – | 0 | 1.000 | 18 | – | 6 | .750 |
| Washington University | 1 | – | 0 | 1.000 | 4 | – | 2 | .667 |
| Missouri | 0 | – | 5 | .000 | 8 | – | 10 | .444 |
† Conference championship winner

The 1907–08 Kansas Jayhawks men's basketball team represented the University of Kansas in its tenth season of collegiate basketball, and its first in the newly formed Missouri Valley Intercollegiate Athletic Association, or MVIAA. After finishing 6–0 in the MVIAA, the Jayhawks won the MVIAA Conference Championship, their first conference championship. The head coach was Phog Allen, serving in his first year of his first tenure. The Jayhawks finished the season 18–6. Following a 19–11 defeat of William Jewell, the Jayhawks had a winning all-time record for the first time. The Jayhawks haven't had a losing all-time record since.

== Roster ==
- Ralph Bergen
- Louis Larson
- George McCune
- Milton Miller
- William Miller
- Roger Peard
- Paul Wohler
- Earl Woodward

== Schedule ==
| Date time, TV | Opponent | Result | Record | Site city, state |
|---|---|---|---|---|
| Dec. 13, 1907* | Ottawa (KS) | W 62–22 | 1–0 | Robinson Gymnasium; Lawrence, Kansas |
| Dec. 19, 1907* | at Ottawa (KS) | L 33–39 | 1–1 | Ottawa, Kansas |
| Dec. 20, 1907* | at Newton YMCA | W 37–32 | 2–1 | Newton, Kansas |
| Dec. 21, 1907* | at Newton YMCA | W 39–32 | 3–1 | Newton, Kansas |
| Jan. 10, 1908* | at William Jewell | L 16–27 | 3–2 | Liberty, Missouri |
| Jan. 17, 1908* | Nebraska | L 17–20 | 3–3 | Robinson Gymnasium; Lawrence, Kansas |
| Jan. 18, 1908* | Nebraska | L 21–23 | 3–4 | Robinson Gymnasium; Lawrence, Kansas |
| Jan. 20, 1908* | Nome (AK) | L 28–34 | 3–5 | Robinson Gymnasium; Lawrence, Kansas |
| Jan. 24, 1908* | Newton YMCA | W 26–25 | 4–5 | Robinson Gymnasium; Lawrence, Kansas |
| Jan. 25, 1908* | Kansas City AC | W 25–16 | 5–5 | Robinson Gymnasium; Lawrence, Kansas |
| Jan. 31, 1908* | Kansas State; Sunflower Showdown | W 50–12 | 6–5 | Robinson Gymnasium; Lawrence, Kansas |
| Feb. 1, 1908* | at Washburn | W 19–17 | 7–5 | Topeka, Kansas |
| Feb. 4, 1908 | Missouri; Border War | W 21–20 | 8–5 | Robinson Gymnasium; Lawrence, Kansas |
| Feb. 5, 1908 | Missouri; Border War | W 24–18 | 9–5 | Robinson Gymnasium; Lawrence, Kansas |
| Feb. 8, 1908* | Washburn | W 39–15 | 10–5 | Robinson Gymnasium; Lawrence, Kansas |
| Feb. 10, 1908* | William Jewell | W 19–11 | 11–5 | Robinson Gymnasium; Lawrence, Kansas |
| Feb. 14, 1908* | at Kansas City AC | W 34–32 | 12–5 | Club House; Kansas City, Missouri |
| Feb. 15, 1908* | at Warrensburg | W 34–16 | 13–5 | Warrensburg, Missouri |
| Feb. 17, 1908 | at Missouri | W 30–19 | 14–5 | Columbia, Missouri |
| Feb. 18, 1908 | at Missouri; Border War | W 26–22 | 15–5 | Rothwell Gymnasium; Columbia, Missouri |
| Feb. 19, 1908* | at Des Moines YMCA | L 17–34 | 15–6 | The Shed; Des Moines, Iowa |
| Feb. 20, 1908* | at Iowa State | W 53–35 | 16–6 | Ames, Iowa |
| Feb. 21, 1908 | at Nebraska | W 28–26 | 17–6 | Grant Memorial Hall; Lincoln, Nebraska |
| Feb. 22, 1908 | at Nebraska | W 28–25 | 18–6 | Grant Memorial Hall; Lincoln, Nebraska |
*Non-conference game. ^{#}Rankings from AP Poll. (#) Tournament seedings in parentheses. All times are in Central Standard Time.
