= 1907–08 Drake Bulldogs men's basketball team =

American college basketball season

1907–08 Drake Bulldogs men's basketball
- Conference: Missouri Valley Intercollegiate Athletic Association
- Record: 1–4 (0–1 MVIAA)
- Head coach: C.A. Pell
- Home arena: None

1907–08 Missouri Valley Intercollegiate Athletic Association men's basketball standings
	Conf.				Overall
Team	W		L	PCT	W		L	PCT
North Division
Nebraska	0	–	0	–	7	–	3	.700
Iowa State	1	–	0	1.000	1	–	1	.500
Drake	0	–	1	.000	1	–	6	.143
South Division
Kansas†	6	–	0	1.000	18	–	6	.750
Washington University	1	–	0	1.000	4	–	2	.667
Missouri	0	–	5	.000	8	–	10	.444
† Conference championship winner

The 1907–08 Drake Bulldogs men's basketball team represented Drake University in the 1907–08 college basketball season. The team was led by second year head coach C.A. Pell. This was also Drakes first season as a member of the Missouri Valley Intercollegiate Athletic Association. They finished with a 2–1 record the previous season.

== Schedule ==
Missouri Valley Intercollegiate Athletic Association Standing: 3rd North Division
Date	Opponent*	Location	Time^{#}	Result	Overall	Conference
**Regular Season Games**
January 10, 1908	YMCA	Away		**L 15–24**	0–1	
February 1, 1908	Simpson College	Away		**L 20–36**	0–2	
February 10, 1908	Central College	Away		**W 29–27**	1–2	
February 29, 1908	**Iowa State College**	Away		**L 16–36**	1–3	0–1
1908	Iowa State Normal School	Away		**L 27–53**	1–4	0–1
All times are in EST. Conference games in **BOLD**.
