= Anthony Chez =

American sports coach and administrator (1872–1937)

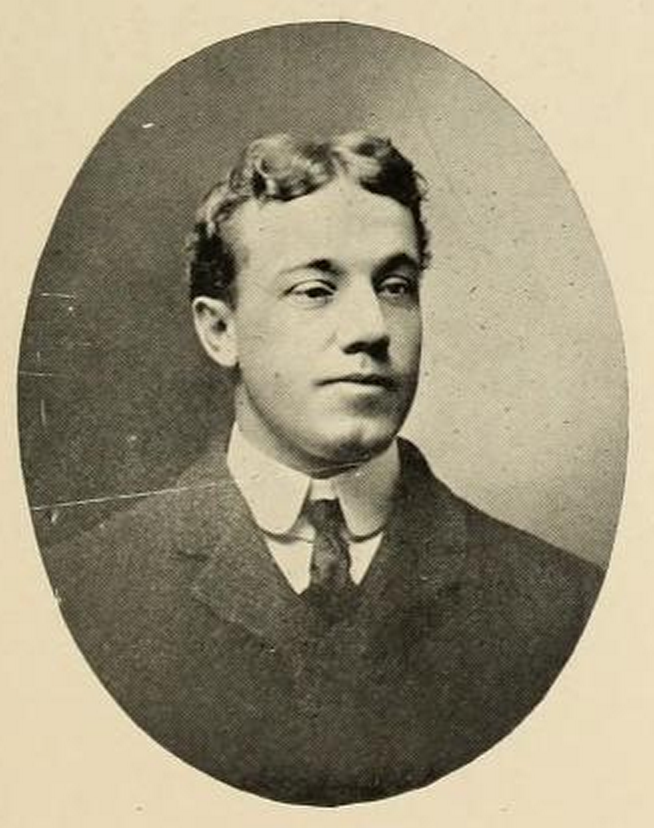
- Chez pictured in The Monticola, West Virginia yearbook

Biographical details
- Born: January 12, 1872; Richmond, Iowa, U.S.
- Died: December 30, 1937 (aged 65) near Lewisburg, Ohio, U.S.
- Education: Oberlin (1900)

Playing career

Football
- 1897–1898: Oberlin

Coaching career (HC unless noted)

Football
- 1900: Wabash
- 1901: DePauw
- 1902–1903: Cincinnati
- 1904: West Virginia

Basketball
- 1902–1904: Cincinnati
- 1904–1907: West Virginia

Baseball
- 1901: Wabash
- 1903–1904: Cincinnati

Administrative career (AD unless noted)
- 1904–1913: West Virginia

Head coaching record
- Overall: 24–20–2 (football); 23–30 (basketball); 20–16–2 (baseball)

Anthony Wencel Chez (January 12, 1872 – December 30, 1937) was an American football, basketball, and baseball coach and college athletics administrator. He served as the head football coach at Wabash College (1900), DePauw University (1901), the University of Cincinnati (1902–1903), and West Virginia University (1904), compiling a career college football record of 24–20–2. Chez was also the head basketball coach at Cincinnati (1902–1904) and West Virginia (1904–1907), amassing a career college basketball record of 27–31. In addition, he was the head baseball coach at Wabash in 1901 and Cincinnati from 1903 to 1904, tallying a career college baseball mark of 20–16–2. From 1904 to 1913 Chez served as West Virginia's athletic director.

== Coaching career ==
Chez was the 13th head football coach at the Wabash College located in Crawfordsville, Indiana and he held that position for the 1900 season. His record at Wabash was 5–4. In 1901, he became head football coach at rival DePauw University, where he led the Tigers to an 8–3 season, including two big wins (32–2, 35–5) over his former employer to the north, Wabash. From 1902 to 1903, he served as the head football coach at the University of Cincinnati, where he compiled a 5–10–2 record. In 1904, he was the head football coach at West Virginia University, where he compiled a 6–3 record.

== Late life and death ==
Chez worked for the YMCA during the World War I period. He died on December 30, 1937, at his home near Lewisburg, Ohio.

== Head coaching record ==
=== Football ===
Year	Team	Overall	Conference	Standing	Bowl/playoffs
Wabash (Independent) (1900)
1900	Wabash	5–4			
Wabash:		5–4			
DePauw (Independent) (1901)
1901	DePauw	8–3			
DePauw:		8–3			
Cincinnati Bearcats (Independent) (1902–1903)
1902	Cincinnati	4–2–2			
1903	Cincinnati	1–8			
Cincinnati:		5–10–2			
West Virginia Mountaineers (Independent) (1904)
1904	West Virginia	6–3			
West Virginia:		6–3			
Total:		24–20–2			

=== Basketball ===
Record table
Season	Team	Overall	Conference	Standing	Postseason
Cincinnati (Independent) (1902–1904)
1902–03	Cincinnati	4–4			
1903–04	Cincinnati	8–6			
Cincinnati:		12–10 (.545)			
West Virginia Mountaineers (Independent) (1904–1907)
1904–05	West Virginia	6–9			
1905–06	West Virginia	5–4			
1906–07	West Virginia	4–8			
Cincinnati:		15–21 (.417)			
Total:		27–31 (.466)			
