= 1906–07 Chicago Maroons men's basketball team =

American college basketball season

1906–07 Chicago Maroons men's basketball
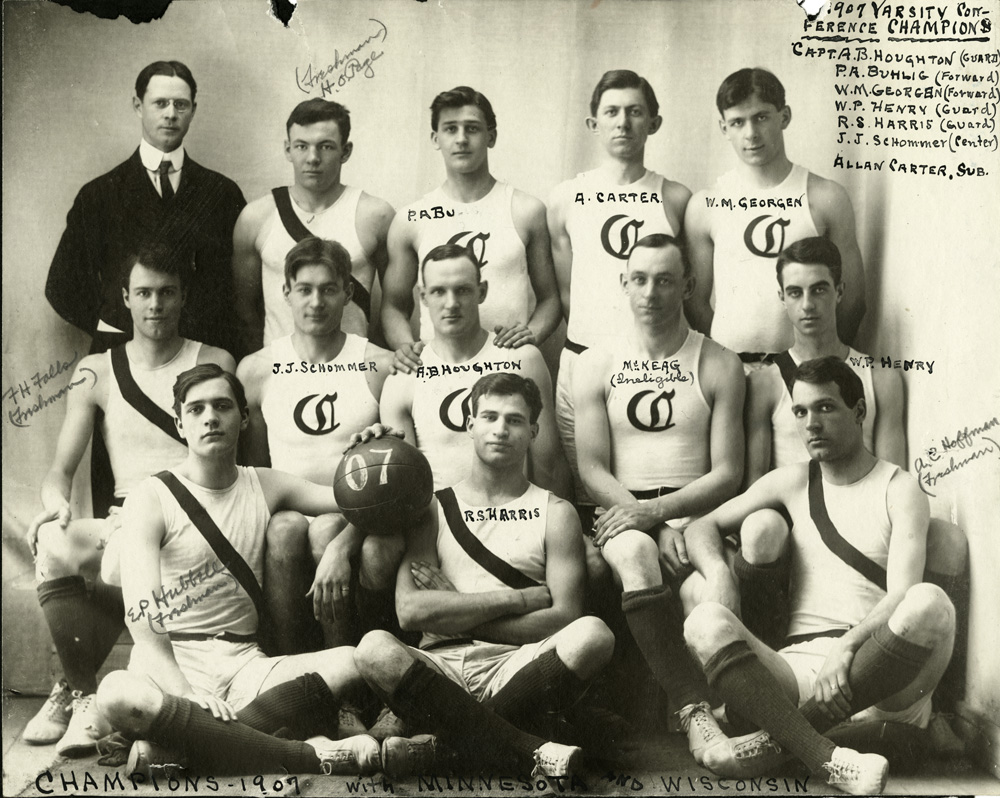

Western Conference Co-Champions Helms Foundation National Champions
- Conference: Big Ten Conference
- Record: 21–2 (6–2 Western)
- Head coach: Joseph Raycroft (1st season)
- Captain: Albert Houghton
- Home arena: Bartlett Gymnasium

1906–07 Western Conference men's basketball standings
| | Conf. | | | | Overall |
| Team | W | | L | PCT | W | | L | PCT |
|---|---|---|---|---|---|---|---|---|
| Chicago | 6 | – | 2 | .750 | 21 | – | 2 | .913 |
| Minnesota | 6 | – | 2 | .750 | 10 | – | 2 | .833 |
| Wisconsin | 6 | – | 2 | .750 | 11 | – | 3 | .786 |
| Purdue | 2 | – | 6 | .250 | 7 | – | 8 | .467 |
| Illinois | 0 | – | 8 | .000 | 1 | – | 10 | .091 |
| Indiana | - | – | - | – | 9 | – | 5 | .643 |
| Iowa | - | – | - | – | 5 | – | 5 | .500 |
| Northwestern | - | – | - | – | 1 | – | 5 | .167 |

The 1906–07 Chicago Maroons men's basketball team represented the University of Chicago in intercollegiate basketball during the 1906–07 season. The team finished the season with a 21–2 record and were retroactively named national champions by the Helms Athletic Foundation. This was the first of three consecutive seasons that Chicago was later named the Helms national champion. The team played their home games on campus at Frank Dickinson Bartlett Gymnasium.

Both Albert Houghton and John Schommer were named All-Americans. For Schommer, it was his second straight All-American honor; for Houghton, it was his first and only time being honored.

== Roster ==
1906–07 Chicago Maroons men's basketball team
Players
Coaches

| Pos. | # | Name | Height | Weight | Year | Hometown |
|---|---|---|---|---|---|---|
| F | | Frederick H. Falls | — | — | Fr | Chicago, IL |
| F | | James McKeag | — | — | Jr | Grinnell, IA |
| C | | John Schommer | — | — | So | Chicago, IL |
| G | | Harlan "Pat" Page | — | — | Fr | Chicago, IL |
| G | | Arthur Hoffman | — | — | Fr | Chicago, IL |
| G | | Albert Houghton (C) | — | — | Sr | Milwaukee, WI |
| F | | Paul Buhlig | — | — | Jr | Chicago, IL |
| C | | Allan Carter | — | — | Jr | DeKalb, IL |
| F | | William M. Georgen | — | — | So | Belvidere, IL |
| G | | Winston Henry | — | — | Fr | Chicago, IL |
| F | | Edwin Hubble | — | — | Fr | Marshfield, MO |
| G | | Robert Harris | — | — | Jr | Chicago, IL |

Head coach

Joseph Raycroft (University of Chicago) (1st year)

Assistant coach(es)

Legend

- (C) Team captain
- (S) Suspended
- (I) Ineligible
- (W) Walk-on
- Injured
- Current redshirt

UChicago Athletics Roster

== Schedule ==
| Date time, TV | Opponent | Result | Record | Site city, state |
|---|---|---|---|---|
| 1/9/1907* no, no | vs. Lewis | W 50-9 | 1-0 (0-0) | Bartlett Gymnasium; Chicago, IL |
| 1/15/1907* no, no | vs. Armour | W 65-16 | 2-0 (0-0) | Bartlett Gymnasium; Chicago, IL |
| 1/19/1907* no, no | vs. Central YMCA | W 26–19 | 3-0 (0-0) | Bartlett Gymnasium; Chicago, IL |
| 1/21/1907 no, no | vs. Northwestern | W 34-6 | 4-0 (0-0) | Bartlett Gymnasium; Chicago, IL |
| 1/26/1907 no, no | vs. Wisconsin | W 24–14 | 5-0 (1-0) | Bartlett Gymnasium; Chicago, IL |
| 2/2/1907 no, no | @ Illinois | W 53–20 | 6-0 (2-0) | Kenney Gym; Urbana, IL |
| 2/9/1907 no, no | vs. Purdue | W 28–16 | 7-0 (3-0) | Bartlett Gymnasium; Chicago, IL |
| 2/16/1907* no, no | vs. Central YMCA | W 27–15 | 8-0 (3-0) | Central YMCA; Chicago, IL |
| 2/23/1907 no, no | vs. Illinois | W 35–20 | 9-0 (4-0) | Bartlett Gymnasium; Chicago, IL |
| 3/2/1907 no, no | @ Minnesota | W 27–24 | 10-0 (5-0) | University of Minnesota Armory; Minneapolis, MN |
| 3/6/1907 no, no | @ Wisconsin | L 11–22 | 10-1 (5-1) | University of Wisconsin Armory and Gymnasium; Madison, WI |
| 3/9/1907 no, no | @ Purdue | W 21–19 | 11-1 (6-1) | Lafayette Colliseum; West Lafayette, IN |
| 3/16/1907 no, no | vs. Minnesota | L 10–20 | 11-2 (6-2) | Bartlett Gymnasium; Chicago, IL |
| 3/21/1907* no, no | vs. Marshfield Co. | W 32–11 | 12-2 (6-2) | Bartlett Gymnasium; Chicago, IL |
| 3/22/1907 no, no | @ Northwestern | W 50–17 | 13-2 (6-2) | Patten Gymnasium; Evanston, IL |
| 3/23/1907* no, no | vs. Central Meteors | W 29–16 | 14-2 (6-2) | Bartlett Gymnasium; Chicago, IL |
| 3/23/1907* no, no | vs. Central YMCA | W 22–19 | 15-2 (6-2) | Bartlett Gymnasium; Chicago, IL |
*Non-conference game. ^{#}Rankings from AP Poll. (#) Tournament seedings in parentheses. All times are in Central Time.
