= 1906–07 Indiana State Sycamores men's basketball team =

American college basketball season

1906–07 Indiana State Sycamores men's basketball
- Conference: Independent
- Record: 1–8
- Head coach: John Kimmell (8th season)
- Home arena: North Hall

The 1906–07 Indiana State Sycamores men's basketball team represented Indiana State University during the 1906–07 collegiate men's basketball season. The head coach was John Kimmell, in his eighth season coaching the Sycamores. The team played their home games at North Hall in Terre Haute, Indiana.

== Schedule ==
Date time, TV	Opponent	Result	Record	Site city, state
12/21/1906	at Purdue	L 10–53	0–1	Lafayette Coliseum; West Lafayette, IN
1/12/1907	at Rose Polytechnic	L 16–41	0–2	
1/19/1907	Butler	L 20–23	0–3	North Hall; Terre Haute, IN
1/25/1907	at DePauw	L 17–20	0–4	Greencastle, IN
1/26/1907	at Indiana	L 17–29	0–5	Old Assembly Hall; Bloomington, IN
2/01/1907	Hanover	W 40–13	1–5	North Hall; Terre Haute, IN
2/09/1906	DePauw	L 18–20	1–6	North Hall; Terre Haute, IN
2/21/1907	Rose Polytechnic	L 10–23	1–7	North Hall; Terre Haute, IN
3/01/1907	Indiana	L 17–21	1–8	North Hall; Terre Haute, IN
*Non-conference game. (#) Tournament seedings in parentheses.
