= Gilmore Kinney =

American basketball player

Gilmore Kinney jr
Personal information
- Born: June 9, 1886 Ness City, Kansas, U.S.
- Died: December 15, 1916 (aged 30) Forest Hills, New York, U.S.
- Listed height: 5 ft 11 in (1.80 m)
- Listed weight: 155 lb (70 kg)

Career information
- High school: Phillips Academy (Andover, Massachusetts)
- College: Yale (1903–1907)
- Position: Forward

Career highlights
- Helms Player of the Year (1907); 2× Consensus All-American (1905, 1907)

Gilmore Kinney (June 9, 1886 – December 15, 1916) was an American college basketball standout at Yale University in the 1900s. He was a two-time Helms Athletic Foundation All-American (1905, 1907) and was named their national player of the year as a senior in 1906–07. That year, he led the Yale Bulldogs to their first-ever Eastern Intercollegiate Basketball League season championship title, and was the league's leading scorer at 10.1 points per game. Kinney also played for Yale's baseball team.

Gilmore Kinney was also the older brother of Orson Kinney, another Yale basketball star who was an All-American in 1916–17.
