= George Flint (basketball) =

American basketball player and coach

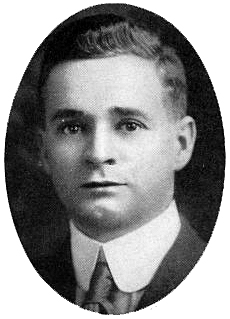
- Flint as head basketball coach at Pittsburgh, c. 1917

Biographical details
- Born: June 13, 1883; Chatham, Ontario, Canada
- Died: January 2, 1960 (aged 76); Pittsburgh, Pennsylvania, U.S.

Playing career
- 1904–1907: Penn
- Position: Center

Coaching career (HC unless noted)
- 1911–1921: Pittsburgh

Head coaching record
- Overall: 105–68

Accomplishments and honors

Awards
- 2× All-American (1906, 1907)

George Melville "Doc" Flint (June 13, 1883 – January 2, 1960) was an American college basketball player and coach. He played at the University of Pennsylvania, where he was a two-time All-American, and served as the head basketball coach at the University of Pittsburgh's for ten seasons, from 1911 to 1921.

== Biography ==
Flint was born in Ontario, Canada and moved to Pennsylvania at an early age. In 1903 he played on a basketball team organized by Pittsburgh Pirates great Honus Wagner. In college, he earned All-American status as basketball player in 1906 and 1907 at the University of Pennsylvania. While at Penn, he played center and served as the captain of the Quakers team that would win an Eastern Intercollegiate championship in 1905–06. He later became the head coach the University of Pittsburgh's Panthers men's basketball team for ten seasons from 1911–12 to 1920–21. While there he compiled an overall record of 105–68 (.607) and was regarded as a "great floor coach" by the local media and was given much credit for building the basketball program from a "bunch of green players". He was noted for his system of "short, snappy passing" and "accurate team play" with excellent foul shooting and "brilliant guards". Highlighting his tenure were city championships and eight winning seasons, in six of which the Panthers won 10-plus games including a 15–2 record in 1915–16. The 1914–15 season saw Pitt in postseason action when the Panthers defeated Penn State at Duquesne Garden, 39–35, to win the sectional title to advance to the state championship in Philadelphia against Swarthmore, which had won the eastern and central championships by defeating Lehigh and Albright. Pitt cruised past Swarthmore 40–26 win to secure the state collegiate championship and finish with a 13–5 record. At Pitt, Flint coached Doc Carlson, a star in both basketball and football at the university, who went on to coach Pitt's basketball team for 31 seasons and was elected to the Naismith Memorial Basketball Hall of Fame. Flint also coached John "Speedo" Loughran, one of Pitt's only athlete to letter in four varsity sports – Football, basketball, baseball and track. Following Flint's coaching career, he worked 50 years as a dentist in the Pittsburgh area. He died on January 2, 1960.
