= 1906–07 Kentucky Wildcats men's basketball team =

1906–07 season of University of Kentucky men's basketball team

1906–07 Kentucky Wildcats men's basketball
- Conference: Independent
- Record: 3–9
- Head coach: Unnamed (3rd season)
- Home arena: State College Gymnasium

The 1906–07 Kentucky State men's basketball team competed on behalf of the University of Kentucky during the 1906–07 season. The team finished with a final record of 3–9.

== Roster ==
1904–05 Kentucky Wildcats men's basketball team
Players
Coaches

| Pos. | # | Name | Height | Weight | Year | Previous school | Hometown |
|---|---|---|---|---|---|---|---|
| F | | Stanley Baer | 5 ft 6 in (1.68 m) | 128 lb (58 kg) | Sr | Unknown | Louisville, Kentucky |
| F | | Leo Brewer | — | — | Jr | Unknown | Mayfield, Kentucky |
| C | | Thomas Bryant | 6 ft 0 in (1.83 m) | — | Jr | Kentucky State College Prep School | Nicholasville, Kentucky |
| G | | Maury Wilson | 5 ft 10 in (1.78 m) | 148 lb (67 kg) | Jr | Louisville Male High School | Louisville, Kentucky |
| G | | Richard Barbee | 5 ft 8 in (1.73 m) | 152 lb (69 kg) | So | Unknown | Lexington, Kentucky |
| F | | Shelby Shanklin | 5 ft 9 in (1.75 m) | 150 lb (68 kg) | So | Unknown | Lexington, Kentucky |
| F/C | | Walter Fox | — | — | Jr | Unknown | Newport, Kentucky |

Head coach

- Unnamed

Assistant coach(es)

{{{asst_coach}}}

Legend

- (C) Team captain
- (S) Suspended
- (I) Ineligible
- (W) Walk-on
- Injured
- Current redshirt

== Schedule ==
| Date time, TV | Rank^{#} | Opponent^{#} | Result | Record | Site city, state |
Regular Season
| 1/16/1907* | | Lexington YMCA | L 17–25 | 0–1 | State College Gymnasium; Lexington, KY |
| 1/12/1906* | | Georgetown College | W 16–15 | 1–1 | State College Gymnasium; Lexington, KY |
| 1/19/1907* | | Centre | W 22–9 | 2–1 | State College Gymnasium; Lexington, KY |
| 2/12/1907* | | Centre | L 23-25 OT | 2–2 | Danville, KY |
| 2/15/1907* | | Kentucky University (now Transylvania) | W 16–14 | 3–2 | State College Gymnasium; Lexington, KY |
| 2/21/1907* | | Georgetown College | L 8–19 | 3–3 | Georgetown College; Georgetown, KY |
| 3/1/1907* | | Lexington YMCA | L 22–41 | 3–4 | Lexington YMCA; Lexington, KY |
| 3/7/1907* | | Kentucky University (nowTransylvania) | L 5–19 | 3–5 | Kentucky University; Lexington, KY |
| 3/9/1907* | | Centre | L 13–15 | 3–6 | State College Gymnasium; Lexington, KY |
*Non-conference game. ^{#}Rankings from AP Poll. (#) Tournament seedings in parentheses.
