= 1906–07 Illinois Fighting Illini men's basketball team =

American college basketball season

1906–07 Illinois Fighting Illini men's basketball
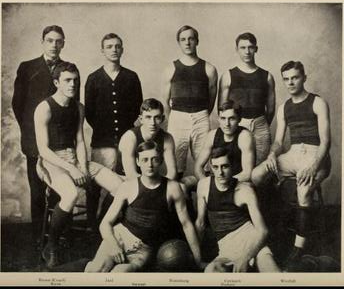
- Conference: Big Ten Conference
- Record: 1–10 (0–8 Big Ten)
- Head coach: Frank L. Pinckney (1st season)
- Captain: Herbert Juul
- Home arena: Kenney Gym

1906–07 Western Conference men's basketball standings
	Conf.				Overall
Team	W		L	PCT	W		L	PCT
Chicago	6	–	2	.750	21	–	2	.913
Minnesota	6	–	2	.750	10	–	2	.833
Wisconsin	6	–	2	.750	11	–	3	.786
Purdue	2	–	6	.250	7	–	8	.467
Illinois	0	–	8	.000	1	–	10	.091
Indiana	-	–	-	–	9	–	5	.643
Iowa	-	–	-	–	5	–	5	.500
Northwestern	-	–	-	–	1	–	5	.167

The 1906–07 Illinois Fighting Illini men's basketball team represented the University of Illinois.

== Regular season ==
Frank Loyer Pinckney took over the coaching reins from Elwood Brown for the 1906–1907 season. After a very promising start to the season, where more than 100 student athletes tried out for the team, Pinckney had three freshmen declared ineligible by the Western Conference. Due to this unfortunate circumstance, the Fighting Illini played the season with a depleted lineup and finished the season with the worst record in the history of the school. The decision to make freshmen ineligible gave Pinckney the same problem Brown had faced one season earlier.

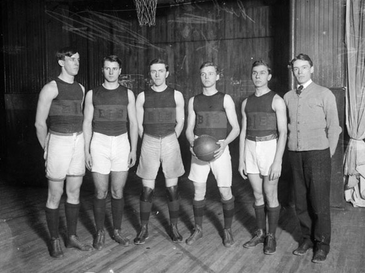
"1906-07 Fighting Illini team"

=== Roster ===
1906–07 Illinois Fighting Illini men's basketball team
Players
Coaches

Pos.	#	Name	Height	Weight	Year	Hometown
F		Charles Stewart	—	—	Jr	New York, New York
G		Edward Ryan	—	—	Jr	Chicago, Illinois
F		Maurice Dadant	—	—	Sr	Hamilton, Illinois
G		Herb Juul (C)	—	—	Sr	Chicago, Illinois
C		Curtis C. Westfall	—	—	Sr	Chicago, Illinois
G		Thomas E. Thompson	—	—	Fr	Williams Bay, Wisconsin
G		Roy Rennacker	—	—	Fr	Winnetka, Illinois
G		Avery Brundage	—	—	So	Chicago, Illinois
F		Henry Popperfuss	—	—	Fr	Tomah, Wisconsin
F		C. E. Norenberg	—	—	Sr	Chicago, Illinois
F/C		Robert Herman Reische	—	—	So	Chicago, Illinois
G		Roy Clifton Caul	—	—	Jr	Chicago, Illinois
C		William Sommerfield	—	—	So	Peoria, Illinois
G		Joseph Julius Cermack	—	—	Fr	Chicago, Illinois

Head coach

- Frank Loyer Pinckney (University of Illinois) (1st year)

Assistant coach(es)

Legend

- (C) Team captain
- (S) Suspended
- (I) Ineligible
- (W) Walk-on
- Injured
- Current redshirt

Roster

== Schedule ==
Date time, TV	Rank^{#}	Opponent^{#}	Result	Record	Site city, state
Non-Conference regular season
December 15, 1906*		at Peoria YMCA	W 38-19	1-0	Peoria YMCA; Peoria, IL
January 2, 1907*		at Chicago YMCA	L 26–31	1-1	Chicago YMCA; Chicago, IL
Big Ten regular season
January 12, 1907		Purdue	L 27–32	1-2 (0-1)	Kenney Gym; Urbana, IL
January 19, 1907		Wisconsin	L 16–22	1-3 (0-2)	Kenney Gym; Urbana, IL
January 31, 1907		at Minnesota	L 3–42	1-4 (0-3)	University of Minnesota Armory; Minneapolis, MN
February 1, 1907		at Wisconsin	L 13–47	1-5 (0-4)	University of Wisconsin Armory and Gymnasium; Madison, WI
February 2, 1907		at University of Chicago	L 20–53	1-6 (0-5)	Bartlett Gymnasium; Chicago, IL
February 15, 1907*		at Wabash College	L 13–50	1-7	Wabash College; Crawfordsville, IN
February 16, 1907		at Purdue	L 18–45	1-8 (0-6)	Lafayette Colliseum; West Lafayette, IN
February 23, 1907		University of Chicago	L 20–35	1-9 (0-7)	Kenney Gym; Urbana, IL
March 1, 1907		Minnesota	L 29–36	1-10 (0-8)	Kenney Gym; Urbana, IL
*Non-conference game. ^{#}Rankings from AP Poll. (#) Tournament seedings in parentheses. All times are in Central Time.
