= 1906–07 Indiana Hoosiers men's basketball team =

American college basketball season

1906–07 Indiana Hoosiers men's basketball
- Conference: Big Ten Conference
- Record: 9–5 (0–0 Western)
- Head coach: James M. Sheldon (1st season)
- Captain: James Sanders
- Home arena: Old Assembly Hall

1906–07 Western Conference men's basketball standings
	Conf.				Overall
Team	W		L	PCT	W		L	PCT
Chicago	6	–	2	.750	21	–	2	.913
Minnesota	6	–	2	.750	10	–	2	.833
Wisconsin	6	–	2	.750	11	–	3	.786
Purdue	2	–	6	.250	7	–	8	.467
Illinois	0	–	8	.000	1	–	10	.091
Indiana	-	–	-	–	9	–	5	.643
Iowa	-	–	-	–	5	–	5	.500
Northwestern	-	–	-	–	1	–	5	.167

The 1906–07 Indiana Hoosiers men's basketball team represented Indiana University. Their head coach was James M. Sheldon, who was in his first and only year. The team played its home games at the Old Assembly Hall in Bloomington, Indiana, and was a member of the Western Conference.

The Hoosiers finished the regular season with an overall record of 9–5 and a conference record of 0–0.

== Roster ==
Name	Position	Year	Hometown
Walt Bossert	G	N/A	Brookville, Indiana
Cecil Boyle	F	N/A	Shoals, Indiana
Edmund Cook	F	N/A	Indianapolis, Indiana
Louis Guedel	G	N/A	Evansville, Indiana
Robert Martin	C	N/A	Dana, Indiana
Harlan McCoy	F	Jr.	Chrisney, Indiana
Claudius Quinn	G	Sr.	Cutler, Indiana
James Sanders	G	Sr.	Jasonville, Indiana
Frank Thompson	G	So.	Winchester, Indiana

== Schedule/results ==
Date time, TV	Rank^{#}	Opponent^{#}	Result	Record	Site city, state
Regular season
1/7/1907*		at DePauw	W 28–25	1–0	Greencastle, IN
1/19/1907*		at Hartford City YMCA	L 28–29	1–1	Hartford City, IN
1/22/1907*		DePauw	W 26–16	2–1	Old Assembly Hall; Bloomington, IN
1/26/1907*		Indiana State	W 29–16	3–1	Old Assembly Hall; Bloomington, IN
2/2/1907*		Wabash	L 24–37	3–2	Old Assembly Hall; Bloomingotn, IN
2/6/1907*		Rose Poly	W 30–20	4–2	Old Assembly Hall; Bloomington, IN
2/8/1907*		at New Albany YMCA	L 17–20	4–3	New Albany, IN
2/9/1907*		at Apollo Athletic Club	W 49–12	5–3	
2/11/1907*		at Butler	W 30–17	6–3	Indianapolis, IN
2/12/1907*		at Indianapolis Athletic Club	L 18–30	6–4	Indianapolis, IN
2/22/1907*		at Wabash	L 20–43	6–5	Crawfordsville, IN
2/23/1907*		Butler	W 42–7	7–5	Old Assembly Hall; Bloomington, IN
3/1/1907*		Indiana State	W 21–19	8–5	Old Assembly Hall; Bloomington, IN
3/2/1907*		at Rose Poly	W 29–27	9–5	Terre Haute, IN
*Non-conference game. ^{#}Rankings from AP Poll. (#) Tournament seedings in parentheses.
