= Speedo Loughran =

American college athlete and coach (1897–1989)

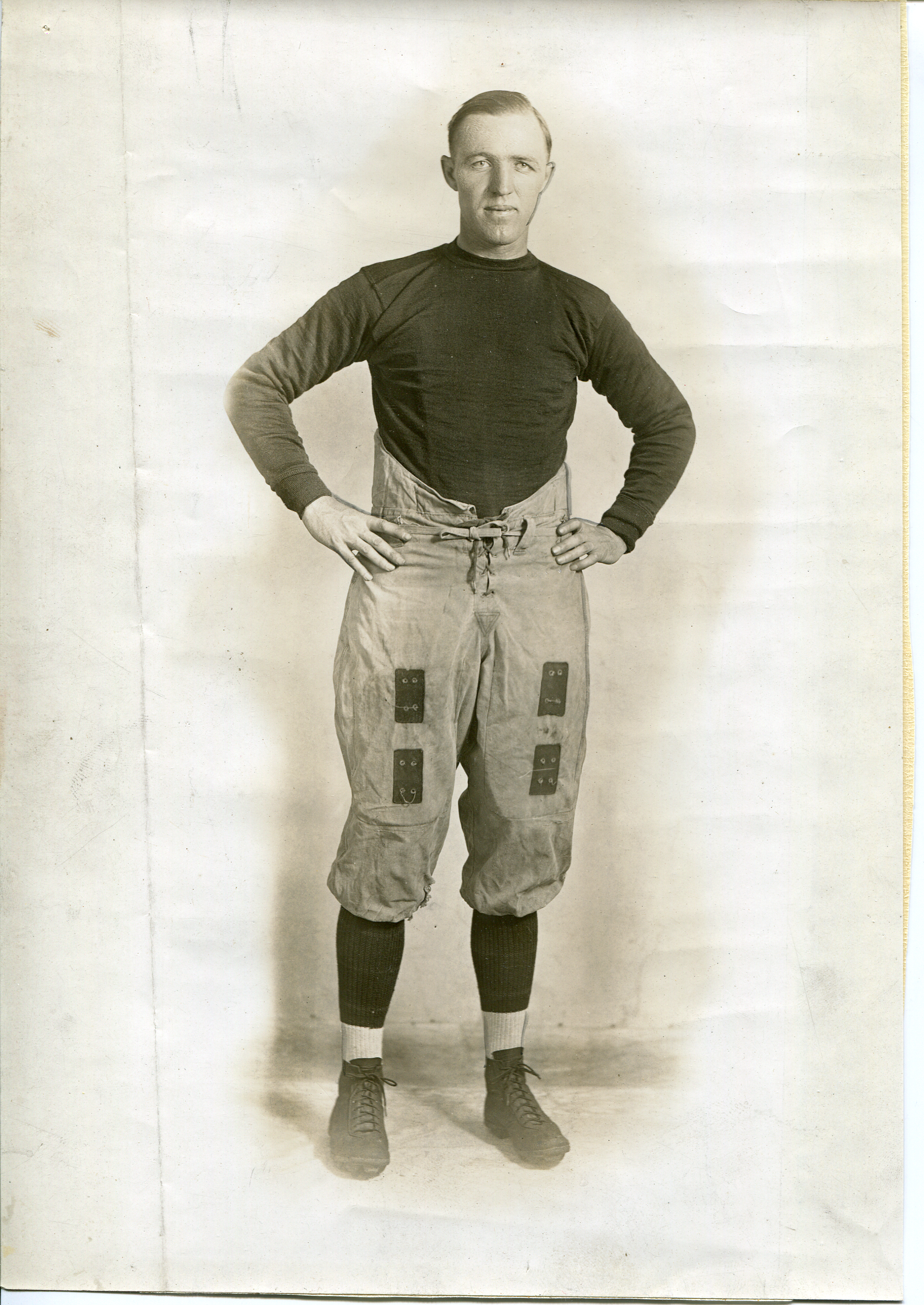

Biographical details
- Born: October 30, 1897
- Died: March 23, 1989 (aged 91)

Playing career

Football
- 1918–1919: Pittsburgh

Basketball
- 1918–1919: Pittsburgh
- Positions: Halfback (football); Center (basketball)

Coaching career (HC unless noted)

Football
- 1922–1923: Saint Francis (PA)

Basketball
- 1920–1924: Saint Francis (PA)

Head coaching record
- Overall: 0–10 (football); 51–20 (basketball)

John James "Speedo" Loughran (October 30, 1897 – March 23, 1989) was an American college football and college basketball player and coach. He served as the head football coach at Saint Francis University in Loretto, Pennsylvania for the 1922 and 1923 seasons, and the head men's basketball coach from 1920 to 1924.

Loughran played college football at the University of Pittsburgh, where he was part of the 1918 national championship team. Loughran lettered in four varsity sports at Pitt: football, basketball, baseball, and track. He was coached in basketball by George Flint.

Loughran was inducted to the Pennsylvania Sports Hall of Fame East Boros Chapter in 1979. He died of pneumonia, on March 23, 1989, at St. Joseph Home for the Aged.
