= 1906–07 Georgia Bulldogs basketball team =

American college basketball season

1906–07 Georgia Bulldogs basketball
- Conference: Southern Intercollegiate Athletic Association
- Record: 2–0 (2–0 SIAA)
- Head coach: Walter T. Forbes (2nd season)
- Captain: C. B. Holtzendorf
- Home arena: Athens YMCA

The 1906–07 Georgia Bulldogs basketball team represented the University of Georgia as a member of the Southern Intercollegiate Athletic Association (SIAA) during the 1906–07 IAAUS men's basketball season. Led by Walter T. Forbes in his second and final year as head coach, the Bulldogs compiled an overall record of 2–0 with an identical mark in conference play.

== Schedule ==
Date time, TV	Opponent	Result	Record	Site city, state
1/12*	Tulane	W 39–21	1–0	Athens YMCA; Athens, GA
1/19*	Mercer	W 65–11	2–0	Athens YMCA; Athens, GA
*Non-conference game. (#) Tournament seedings in parentheses.
