= Frank L. Pinckney =

American basketball coach (1884–1945)

- Frank L. Pinckney

Biographical details
- Born: September 20, 1884; Pontiac, Illinois, U.S.
- Died: June 11, 1945 (aged 60); Proviso, Illinois, U.S.

Playing career
- 1905–1906: Illinois (football)
- Position: Fullback

Coaching career (HC unless noted)
- 1906–1907: Illinois

Head coaching record
- Overall: 1–10 (0–8 Big Ten)

Frank Loyer Pinckney (September 20, 1884 – June 11, 1945) was an American college basketball coach for the University of Illinois from 1906 to 1907. Pinckney coached the Fighting Illini to a record of 1 win and 10 losses with the only victory coming against the Peoria YMCA. He graduated from the University of Illinois with an Artium Baccalaureatus (A.B.) degree in science. After coaching the Illini, Pinckney moved to Dundee, Illinois, and taught manual training to high school students from 1910 to 1912. After leaving Dundee, Pinckney joined the Illinois militia as a sergeant in with the 314 motor supply train of the American Expeditionary Forces serving in France during World War I.

== Personal life ==
Pinckney was born in Pontiac, Illinois, on September 20, 1884. He was the son of Seymour V. Pinckney and Ida Mae Constible. He married Rosa Wenzelmann and had a primary occupation of teacher for all of his adult life. Pinckney died on June 11, 1945, in Proviso, Illinois.
