= 1907–08 Missouri Tigers men's basketball team =

American college basketball season

1907–08 Missouri Tigers men's basketball
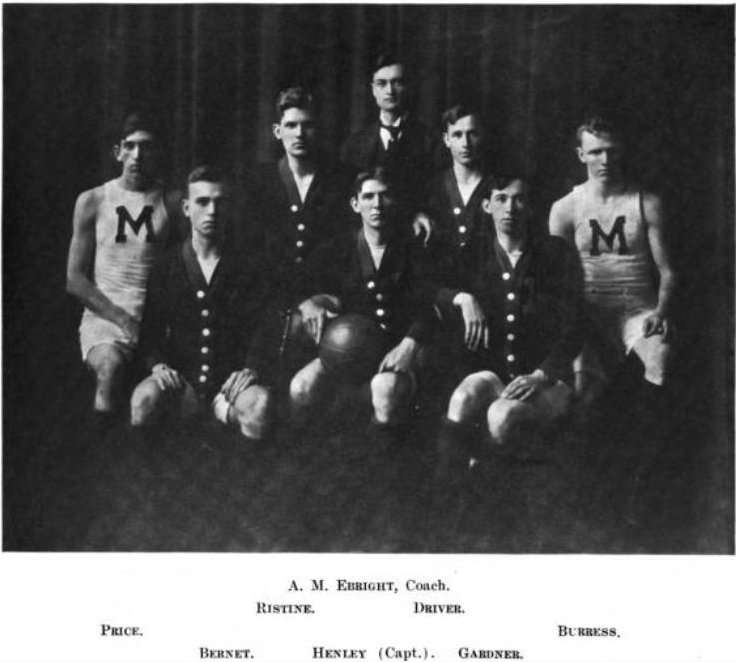
- Conference: Missouri Valley Intercollegiate Athletic Association
- Record: 8–10 (0–8 MVIAA)
- Head coach: A. M. Ebright
- Home arena: Rothwell Gymnasium

1907–08 Missouri Valley Intercollegiate Athletic Association men's basketball standings
	Conf.				Overall
Team	W		L	PCT	W		L	PCT
North Division
Nebraska	0	–	0	–	7	–	3	.700
Iowa State	1	–	0	1.000	1	–	1	.500
Drake	0	–	1	.000	1	–	6	.143
South Division
Kansas†	6	–	0	1.000	18	–	6	.750
Washington University	1	–	0	1.000	4	–	2	.667
Missouri	0	–	5	.000	8	–	10	.444
† Conference championship winner

The 1907–08 Missouri Tigers men's basketball team represented University of Missouri in the 1907–08 college basketball season. The team was led by first year head coach A.M. Ebright. The captain of the team was H.A. Henley for the second year in a row.

Missouri finished with an 8–10 record overall and a 0–8 record in the Missouri Valley Intercollegiate Athletic Association. This was good enough for a 3rd-place finish in the conference regular season standings.

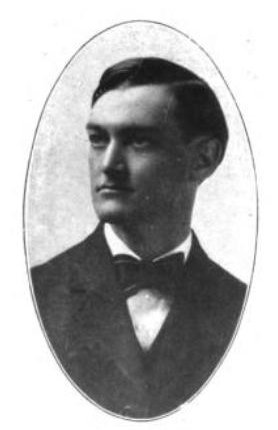
Coach A. Mills Ebright

== Schedule and results ==
Date time, TV	Rank^{#}	Opponent^{#}	Result	Record	Site city, state
December 12*		Joplin YMCA	W 42–21	1–0	Columbia, Missouri
December 13*		Missouri-Rolla	W 39–18	2–0	Columbia, Missouri
December 14*		Missouri-Rolla	W 75–11	3–0	Columbia, Missouri
December 17*		Central Missouri	W 34–16	4–0	Warrensburg, Missouri
January 28*		at MO Athletic Club	W 31–30	5–0	St. Louis, Missouri
January 29		at Washington (MO)	L 22–30	5–1 (0–1)	St. Louis, Missouri
January 30		at Iowa	L 15–46	5–2 (0–2)	Iowa City, Iowa
January 31		at Nebraska	L 30–41	5–3 (0–3)	Lincoln, Nebraska
February 1		at Nebraska	L 31–43	5–4 (0–4)	Lincoln, Nebraska
February 3*		at Kansas City Athletic Club	W 46–27	6–4 (0–4)	Kansas City, Missouri
February 4		at Kansas	L 20–21	6–5 (0–5)	Lawrence, Kansas
February 5		at Kansas	L 18–24	6–6 (0–6)	Lawrence, Kansas
February 6*		at Central Missouri	W 46–16	7–6 (0–6)	Warrensburg, Missouri
February 8*		Baker	W 38–28	8–6 (0–6)	Columbia, Missouri
February 15*		MO Athletic Club	L 24–36	8–7 (0–6)	Columbia, Missouri
February 17		Kansas	L 19–30	8–8 (0–7)	Columbia, Missouri
February 18		Kansas	L 22–26	8–9 (0–8)	Columbia, Missouri
February 22*		K.C. Athletic Club	L 28–34	8–10 (0–8)	Columbia, Missouri
*Non-conference game. ^{#}Rankings from Coaches' Poll. (#) Tournament seedings in parentheses. All times are in Central Standard Time.
