= Walter Fox =

English footballer

Personal information
- Full name: Walter Fox
- Date of birth: 10 April 1921
- Place of birth: Bolsover, England
- Date of death: 2000 (aged 78–79)
- Position: Full back

Senior career*
Years	Team	Apps	(Gls)
1945–1946	Creswell Colliery		
1946–1950	Mansfield Town	62	(0)
1950	Goole Town		
Total		62	(0)
- * Club domestic league appearances and goals

Walter Fox (10 April 1921 – 2000) was an English professional footballer who played in the Football League for Mansfield Town.
