= 1906–07 Army Cadets men's basketball team =

American college basketball season

1906–07 Army Cadets men's basketball
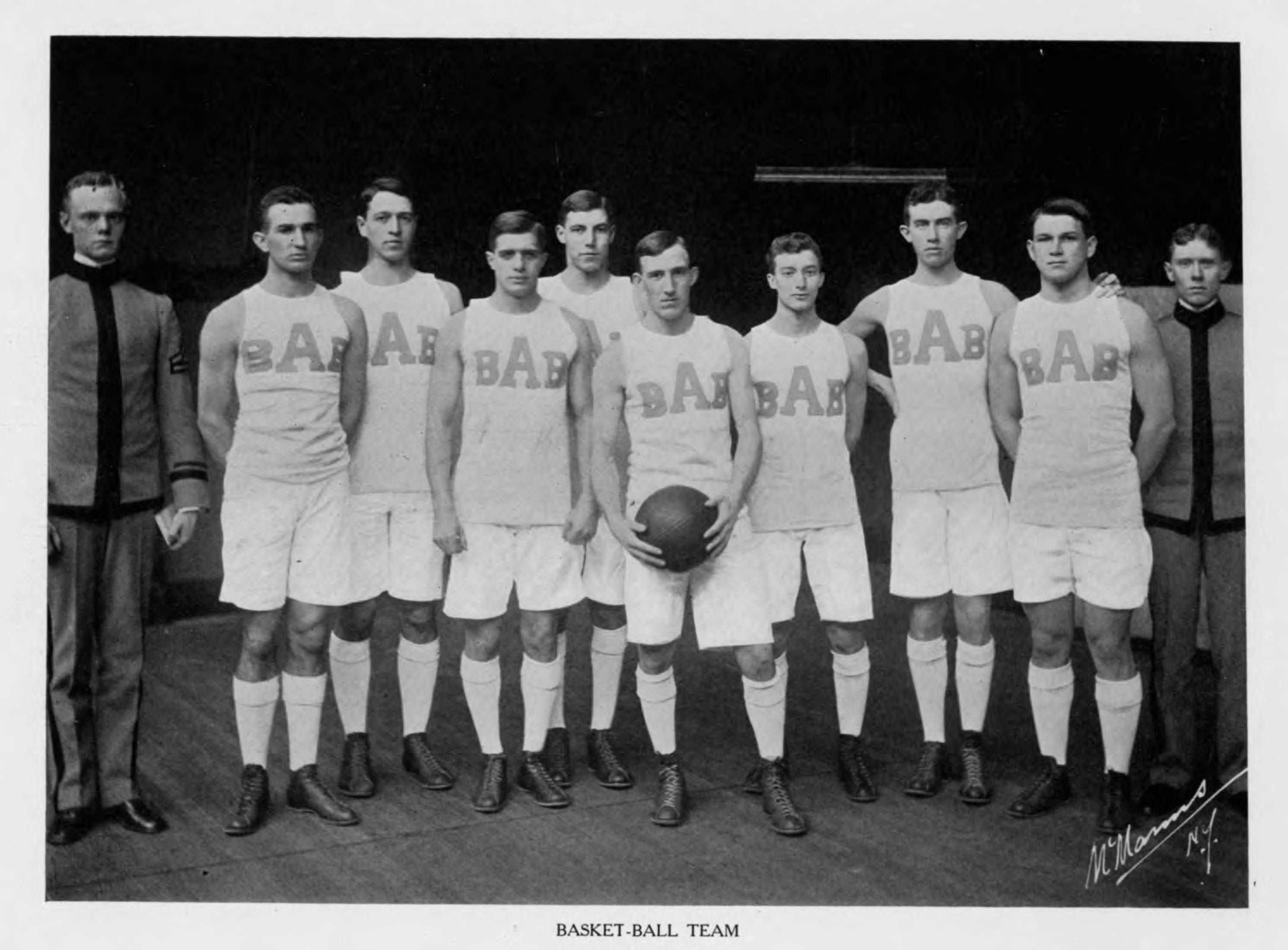
- Conference: Independent
- Record: 9–5
- Head coach: Harry A. Fisher (1st season)
- Captain: Lewis Rockwell

The 1906–07 Army Cadets men's basketball team represented United States Military Academy during the 1906–07 college men's basketball season. The head coach was Harry A. Fisher, coaching his first season with the Cadets. The team captain was Lewis Rockwell.

== Schedule ==
Date time, TV	Opponent	Result	Record	Site city, state
	Pratt Institute	W 35–33	1–0	West Point, NY
	Manhattan	W 57–20	2–0	West Point, NY
	Brooklyn Poly. Inst.	W 42–20	3–0	West Point, NY
	Stevens Institute	W 80–10	4–0	West Point, NY
	Princeton	L 27–29	4–1	West Point, NY
	Columbia	L 13–34	4–2	West Point, NY
	Colgate	L 19–27	4–3	West Point, NY
	Mass. Inst. Tech.	W 19–13	5–3	West Point, NY
	C.C.N.Y.	L 23–28	5–4	West Point, NY
2/15/1907	Penn State	W 32–16	6–4	West Point, NY
	Fordham	W 30–15	7–4	West Point, NY
	Lehigh	L 24–26	7–5	West Point, NY
	Troy Institute Tech.	W 54–19	8–5	West Point, NY
	Trinity	W 39–24	9–5	West Point, NY
*Non-conference game. (#) Tournament seedings in parentheses.
