= H. W. Withers =

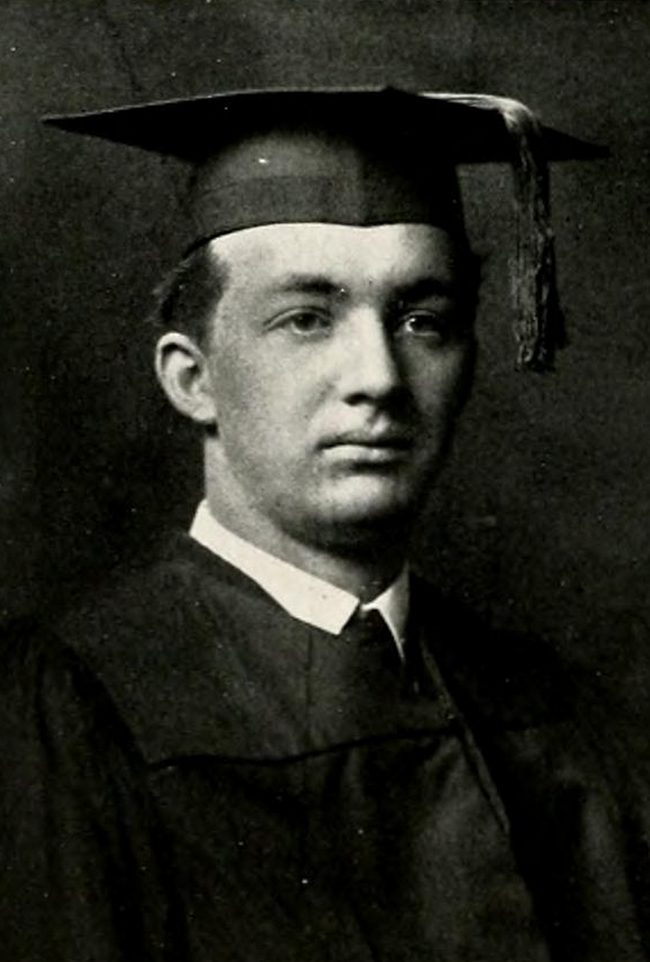
- Withers's senior portrait at Washington & Lee in The Calyx 1906 yearbook

Biographical details
- Born: September 10, 1884; Abingdon, Virginia, U.S.
- Died: June 15, 1949 (aged 64); Abingdon, Virginia, U.S.
- Education: Washington & Lee University (1906)

Coaching career (HC unless noted)

Football
- 1906: William & Mary

Basketball
- 1906–1907: William & Mary

Administrative career (AD unless noted)
- 1906–1907: William & Mary

Head coaching record
- Overall: 2–6 (football); 1–4 (basketball)

Henry Wilson Withers (September 10, 1884 – June 15, 1949) was an American gymnast who was the head coach of the William & Mary Tribe men's basketball team in 1906–07. He led the team to a 1–4 record, the exact opposite of their inaugural 4–1 campaign.

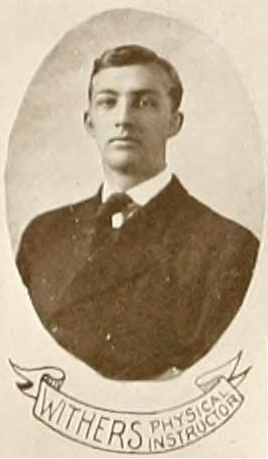
Withers pictured in the Colonial Echo 1907, William and Mary yearbook

Withers was also William & Mary's head football coach in 1906, finishing 2–6.

Withers died of a heart attack in 1949. At the time of his death, he was working as a hardware merchant in Abingdon.

== Head coaching record ==
=== Football ===
| Year | Team | Overall | Conference | Standing | Bowl/playoffs |
|---|---|---|---|---|---|
William & Mary Orange and White (Eastern Virginia Intercollegiate Athletic Association) (1906)
| 1906 | William & Mary | 2–6 | 0–2 | | |
| William & Mary: | | 2–6 | 0–2 | | |
| Total: | | 2–6 | | | |

=== Basketball ===
Record table
| Season | Team | Overall | Conference | Standing | Postseason |
|---|---|---|---|---|---|
William & Mary Indians (Independent) (1906–1907)
| 1906–07 | William & Mary | 1–4 | | | |
| William & Mary: | | 1–4 | | | |
| Total: | | 1–4 | | | |
