= 1906–07 Wisconsin Badgers men's basketball team =

American college basketball season

1906–07 Wisconsin Badgers men's basketball

Western Conference co-champion
- Conference: Western Conference
- Record: 11–3 (6–2 Western)
- Head coach: Emmett Angell (3rd season)
- Home arena: Red Gym

1906–07 Western Conference men's basketball standings
	Conf.				Overall
Team	W		L	PCT	W		L	PCT
Chicago	6	–	2	.750	21	–	2	.913
Minnesota	6	–	2	.750	10	–	2	.833
Wisconsin	6	–	2	.750	11	–	3	.786
Purdue	2	–	6	.250	7	–	8	.467
Illinois	0	–	8	.000	1	–	10	.091
Indiana	-	–	-	–	9	–	5	.643
Iowa	-	–	-	–	5	–	5	.500
Northwestern	-	–	-	–	1	–	5	.167

The 1906–07 Wisconsin Badgers men's basketball team represented University of Wisconsin–Madison. The head coach was Emmett Angell, coaching his third season with the Badgers. The team played their home games at the Red Gym in Madison, Wisconsin and was a member of the Western Conference.

== Schedule ==
Date time, TV	Rank^{#}	Opponent^{#}	Result	Record	Site city, state
12/08/1906*		Milton (WI)	W 38–14	1–0	Red Gym; Madison, WI
12/14/1906*		Ripon (WI)	W 41–20	2–0	Red Gym; Madison, WI
1/04/1907*		Columbia	L 9–30	2–1	Red Gym; Madison, WI
1/11/1907*		at UW–Stout	W 29–19	3–1	Menomonie, WI
1/12/1907		at Minnesota	L 11–18	3–2 (0–1)	Minnesota Armory; Minneapolis, MN
1/18/1907*		at Beloit (WI)	W 38–11	4–2	Beloit, WI
1/19/1907		at Illinois	W 22–16	5–2 (1–1)	Kenney Gym; Urbana, IL
1/25/1907		at Purdue	W 33–27	6–2 (2–1)	Lafayette Colliseum; West Lafayette, IN
1/26/1907		at Chicago	L 14–24	6–3 (2–2)	Bartlett Gymnasium; Chicago, IL
2/01/1907		Illinois	W 47–14	7–3 (3–2)	Red Gym; Madison, WI
2/21/1907*		Nebraska	W 35–31	8–3	Red Gym; Madison, WI
3/06/1907		Chicago	W 22–11	9–3 (4–2)	Red Gym; Madison, WI
3/09/1907		Minnesota	W 31–20	10–3 (5–2)	Red Gym; Madison, WI
3/15/1907		Purdue	W 37–10	11–3 (6–2)	Red Gym; Madison, WI
*Non-conference game. ^{#}Rankings from AP Poll. (#) Tournament seedings in parentheses.
