= Isadore Anderson =

American basketball coach

Biographical details
- Born: June 20, 1880
- Died: September 6, 1961 (aged 81); Kansas City, Missouri, U.S.

Playing career

Football
- 1901: Missouri
- 1903: Missouri

Coaching career (HC unless noted)

Football
- c. 1905: Missouri (assistant)

Basketball
- 1906–1907: Missouri

Wrestling
- c. 1905: Missouri

Head coaching record
- Overall: 10–6 (basketball)

Axel Isadore Anderson (June 20, 1880 – September 6, 1961) was an American football player, coach of football, basketball, and wrestling, and anesthesiologist. He was the first head basketball coach at the University of Missouri, serving one season, in 1906–07. His 1906–07 Missouri Tigers men's basketball team twice beat the Kansas Jayhawks, coached by James Naismith, the inventor of basketball.

Anderson played college football at Missouri, lettering in 1901 and 1903, before graduating in 1904. In addition to coaching basketball, he also was an assistant football coach and wrestling coach at his alma mater. He later refereed football in the Missouri River Valley. Anderson worked as an anesthesiologist at Saint Luke's Hospital in Kansas City, Missouri from 1910 until his retirement in 1947. He died at Saint Luke's, on September 6, 1961.

His great-granddaughter is the actress Emily Wickersham.

== Head coaching record ==
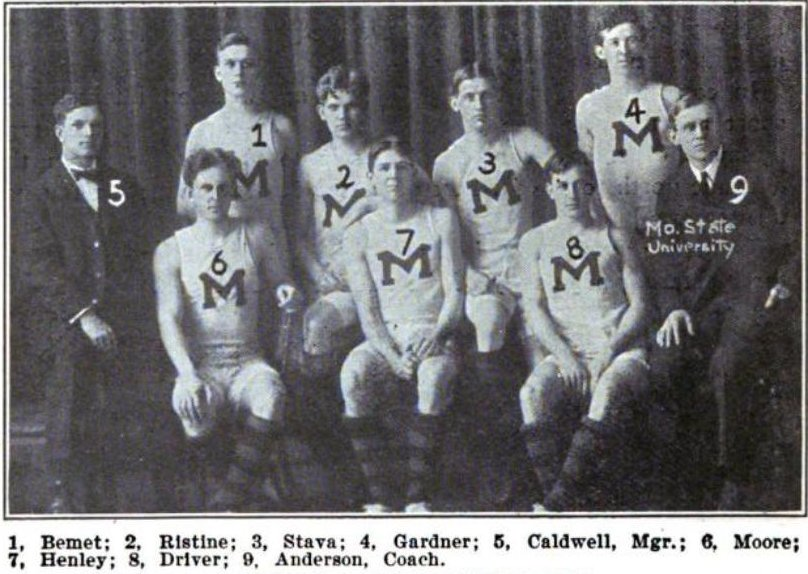
The first Missouri Tigers basketball team (Anderson is number 9).

=== Basketball ===
Record table
Season	Team	Overall	Conference	Standing	Postseason
Missouri Tigers (Independent) (1906–1907)
1906–07	Missouri	10–6			
Missouri:		10–6			
Total:		10–6			
