= 1906–07 Trinity Blue and White men's basketball team =

American college basketball season

1906–07 Trinity Blue and White men's basketball
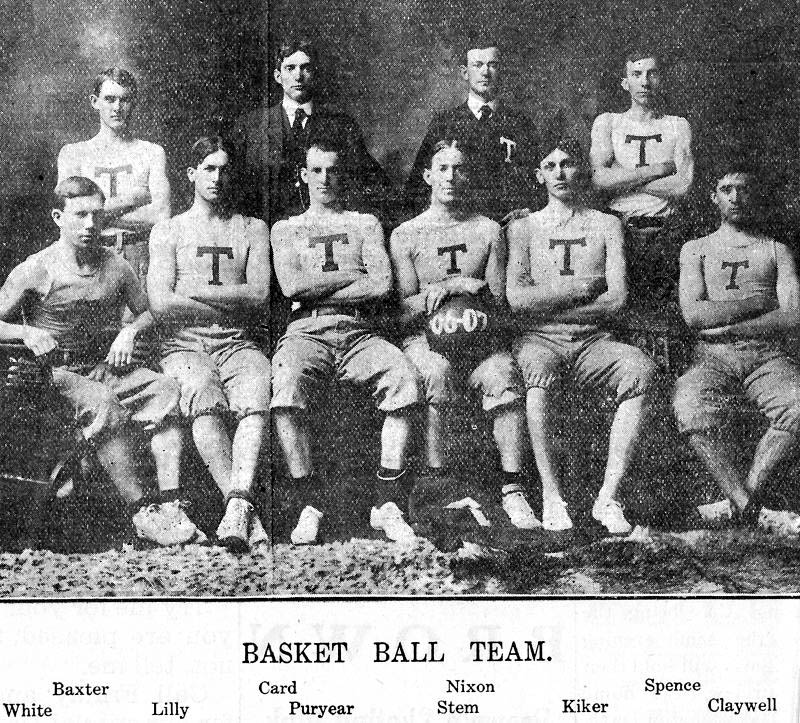
- Conference: Independent
- Record: 3–2
- Head coach: Wilbur Wade Card (2nd season)
- Captain: Thad Stem
- Home arena: Angier B Duke Gymnasium

The 1906–07 Trinity Blue and White's basketball team represented Trinity College (later renamed Duke University) during the 1906–07 men's college basketball season. The head coach was Wilbur Wade Card and the team finished with an overall record of 3–2.

== Schedule ==
| Date time, TV | Opponent | Result | Record | Site city, state |
|---|---|---|---|---|
| November 1* | at Trinity Park (exhibition game) | W 24–1 | 0-0 | Angier B Duke Gymnasium; Durham, NC |
| November 28* | at Wake Forest | L 6–8 | 0-1 | Angier B Duke Gymnasium; Durham, NC |
| December 6* | at Littleton HS | W 62–1 | 1-1 | Angier B Duke Gymnasium; Durham, NC |
| December 18* | at Trinity Park | W 38-6 | 2-1 | Angier B Duke Gymnasium; Durham, NC |
| January 31* | at Guilford College | W 20–1 | 3-1 | Angier B Duke Gymnasium; Durham, NC |
| February 8* | at Wake Forest | L 5–22 | 3-2 | Campus gymnasium Wake Forest, NC |
*Non-conference game. (#) Tournament seedings in parentheses.

== Players ==
| Name | Position | Height | Weight |
|---|---|---|---|
| Garland Greever | Forward | 5'8" | 146 |
| Thad Stem (captain) | Guard | 5'11.5" | 175 |
| L G White | Guard | 5'6" | 135 |
| C R Claywell | Forward | 5'9" | 150 |
| P J Kiker | Center | 6'3" | 190 |
| W G Puryear | Forward | 5'11" | 160 |
| O D Baxter | Forward | 5'5" | 135 |
| H E Spence | Guard | 5'10" | 152 |
| W B Lilly | Forward | 6'1" | 175 |

== Player statistics ==
| Name | Games | FG made | FT made | Fouls | PPG |
|---|---|---|---|---|---|
| Garland Greever | 1 | 1 | 0 | 2 | 2 |
| T G Stem | 5 | 1 | 5 | 4 | 1.4 |
| L G White | 4 | 0 | 0 | 12 | 0.0 |
| C R Claywell | 2 | 9 | 0 | 2 | 4.5 |
| P J Kiker | 5 | 24 | 4 | 7 | 10.4 |
| W G Puryear | 4 | 9 | 0 | 2 | 4.5 |
| O D Baxter | 3 | 7 | 0 | 0 | 4.7 |
| H E Spence | 3 | 1 | 0 | 2 | 0.7 |
| W B Lilly | 4 | 9 | 0 | 12 | 4.5 |
