= 1906–07 Auburn Tigers men's basketball team =

American college basketball season

1906–07 Auburn Tigers men's basketball

SIAA champion
- Conference: Southern Intercollegiate Athletic Association
- Record: 4–2 (2–0 SIAA)
- Head coach: Mike Donahue (2nd season)
- Captain: C.W. Woodruff
- Home arena: The Gymnasium

The 1906–07 Auburn Tigers men's basketball team represented Auburn University during the 1906–07 college basketball season. The team captain was forward C.W. Woodruff.

== Schedule ==
Date time, TV	Opponent	Result	Record	Site city, state
January 19, 1907*	Tulane	W 35–15	1–0	The Gymnasium; Auburn, AL
February 2	Mercer	W 48–9	2–0	The Gymnasium; Auburn, AL
February 9*	Columbus YMCA	W 29–27 ^{OT}	3–0	The Gymnasium; Auburn, AL
February 18*	at Birmingham Athletic Club	L 23–29	3–1	Birmingham, AL
February 23*	at Columbus YMCA	W 16–11	4–1	
March 30*	Birmingham Athletic Club	L 20–21	4–2	
*Non-conference game. (#) Tournament seedings in parentheses.
