= 1906–07 Cincinnati Bearcats men's basketball team =

American college basketball season

1906–07 Cincinnati Bearcats men's basketball
- Conference: Independent
- Record: 7–2
- Head coach: Amos Foster (3rd season)
- Captain: Norman Conway
- Home arena: Schmidlapp Gymnasium

The 1906–07 Cincinnati Bearcats men's basketball team represented the University of Cincinnati during the 1906–07 college men's basketball season. The head coach was Amos Foster, coaching his third season with the Bearcats.

The opponents and scores of six of the games is incomplete. Though the overall record is known, only the details of the following three games are on record.

== Schedule ==
Date time, TV	Opponent	Result	Record	Site city, state
January 12	at Ohio State	W 32–30	1–0	Ohio State Armory; Columbus, OH
January 30	Miami (OH)	L 14–29	1–1	Oxford, OH
January 31	at Dayton	L 8–32	1–2	Montgomery County Fairgrounds Coliseum; Dayton, OH
*Non-conference game. (#) Tournament seedings in parentheses.
