= 1906–07 Connecticut Aggies men's basketball team =

American college basketball season

1906–07 Connecticut Aggies men's basketball
- Conference: Athletic League of New England State Colleges
- Record: 5–7 (0–4 ALNESC)

The 1906–07 Connecticut Aggies men's basketball team represented Connecticut Agricultural College, now the University of Connecticut, in the 1906–07 collegiate men's basketball season. The Aggies completed the season with a 5–7 overall record. The Aggies were members of the Athletic League of New England State Colleges where they ended the season with a 0–4 record.

== Schedule ==
Date time, TV	Rank^{#}	Opponent^{#}	Result	Record	Site (attendance) city, state
Regular Season
		Massachusetts	L 27–34	0–1 (0–1)	
*		Hartford High School	W 69–19	1–1	
*		Crescent A.C.	W 85–14	2–1	
		New Hampshire	L 11–33	2–2 (0–2)	
*		Andover Academy	L 10–46	2–3	
		Rhode Island	L 18–23	2–4 (0–3)	
		Massachusetts	L 16–24	2–5 (0–4)	
*		Alumni	W 71–28	3–5	
*		Willimantic YMCA	W 21–12	4–5	
*		Dean Academy	W 53–33	5–5	
*		Trinity	L 18–44	5–6	
*		Trinity	L 29–44	5–7	
*Non-conference game. ^{#}Rankings from AP Poll. (#) Tournament seedings in parentheses. All times are in Eastern Time.

Schedule Source:
