= 1906–07 West Virginia Mountaineers men's basketball team =

American college basketball season

1906–07 West Virginia Mountaineers men's basketball
- Conference: Independent
- Record: 4–8
- Head coach: Anthony Chez (2nd season)
- Captain: Earl Mason

The 1906–07 West Virginia Mountaineers men's basketball team represented the University of West Virginia during the 1906–07 college men's basketball season. The team captain was Earl Mason.

== Schedule ==
Date time, TV	Opponent	Result	Record	Site city, state
January 26, 1907*	Westminster	L 21–46	0–1	Morgantown, WV
February 2, 1907*	Bethany	W 20–16	1–1	Morgantown, WV
February 9, 1907*	Wilmerding YMCA	W 60–04	2–1	Morgantown, WV
February 14, 1907*	at W.U.P. (Pitt)	L 14–44	2–2	Duquesne Garden; Pittsburgh, PA
February 16, 1907*	at Circleville	L 19–43	2–3	Circleville, OH
February 17, 1907*	at Ohio Wesleyan	L 21–46	2–4	Delaware, OH
February 19, 1907*	at Smith Skating Rink	L 5–53	2–5	Columbus, OH
February 20, 1907*	at Ohio	L 9–20	2–6	Athens, OH
February 21, 1907*	at Marietta YMCA	L 27–40	2–7	Marietta, OH
March 2, 1907*	W.U.P. (Pitt)	W 26–20	3–7	Morgantown, WV
March 9, 1907*	McKeesport	W 27–13	4–7	Morgantown, WV
March 22, 1907*	at Parkersburg YMCA	L 14–20	4–8	Parkersburg, PA
*Non-conference game. (#) Tournament seedings in parentheses.
