= 1906–07 Niagara Purple Eagles men's basketball team =

American college basketball season

1906–07 Niagara Purple Eagles men's basketball
- Conference: Independent
- Record: 5–5
- Head coach: Jack Reed (1st season)

The 1906–07 Niagara Purple Eagles men's basketball team represented Niagara University during the 1906–07 college men's basketball season. The head coach was Jack Reed, coaching his first season with the Purple Eagles.

== Schedule ==
| Date time, TV | Opponent | Result | Record | Site city, state |
|---|---|---|---|---|
| | Oakdale Club | L 10–16 | 0–1 | Lewiston, NY |
| | Lakewood | W 31–9 | 1–1 | Lewiston, NY |
| | Buffalo | L 9–36 | 1–2 | Lewiston, NY |
| | St. Brigid's Club | W 20–16 | 2–2 | Lewiston, NY |
| | St. Patrick's A.A. | W 27–13 | 3–2 | Lewiston, NY |
| | Buffalo Ariels | L 17–29 | 3–3 | Lewiston, NY |
| 2/26/1907 | Canisius | W 28–18 | 4–3 | Lewiston, NY |
| | St. Brigid's Club | L 17–18 | 4–4 | Lewiston, NY |
| 3/2/1907 | at Canisius | L 17–29 | 4–5 | Buffalo, NY |
| | St. Brigid's Club | W 25–12 | 5–5 | Lewiston, NY |
*Non-conference game. (#) Tournament seedings in parentheses.
