= 1906–07 William & Mary Indians men's basketball team =

American college basketball season

1906–07 William & Mary Indians men's basketball
- Conference: Independent
- Record: 1–4
- Head coach: H. W. Withers (1st season)

The 1906–07 William & Mary Indians men's basketball team represented the College of William & Mary in intercollegiate basketball during the 1906–07 season. The team finished the season with a 1–4 record. This was the second season in program history for William & Mary, whose nickname is now "Tribe."

== Schedule ==
Date time, TV	Rank^{#}	Opponent^{#}	Result	Record	Site city, state
Regular season
*		Hampton Athletic Club	L 8–31	0–1	Williamsburg, VA
*		Newport News YMCA	L 10–18	0–2	Williamsburg, VA
*		Newport News YMCA	L 10–18	0–3	Williamsburg, VA
*		Portsmouth YMCA	L 13–49	0–4	Williamsburg, VA
*		Richmond YMCA	W 38–17	1–4	Williamsburg, VA
*Non-conference game. ^{#}Rankings from AP Poll. (#) Tournament seedings in parentheses.
