= 1906–07 NYU Violets men's basketball team =

American college basketball season

1906–07 NYU Violets men's basketball
- Conference: Independent
- Record: 5–2
- Captain: John Longworth

The 1906–07 NYU Violets men's basketball team represented New York University during the 1906–07 collegiate men's basketball season. The team finished with an overall record of 5–2.

== Schedule ==
Date time, TV	Opponent	Result	Record	Site city, state
Jan. 4, 1907	Brooklyn Polytechnic	L 14–25	0–1	New York, NY
Jan. 12, 1907	at Lehigh	L 24–78	0–2	Bethlehem, PA
Jan. 18, 1907	Rutgers	W 38–16	1–2	New York, NY
Jan. 19, 1907	at RPI	W 32–31	2–2	Troy, NY
Feb. 1, 1907	Pratt	W 36–33	3–2	New York, NY
Feb. 16, 1907	at Rutgers	W 20–19	4–2	Original College Avenue Gymnasium; New Brunswick, NJ
Mar. 8, 1907	R.P.I.	W 37–24	5–2	New York, NY
*Non-conference game. (#) Tournament seedings in parentheses.
