= 1906–07 Drake Bulldogs men's basketball team =

American college basketball season

1906–07 Drake Bulldogs men's basketball
- Conference: N/A
- Record: 2–1 ( N/A)
- Head coach: C.A. Pell
- Home arena: None

The 1906–07 Drake Bulldogs men's basketball team represented Drake University in the 1906–07 college basketball season, the first in the school's history. C.A. Pell coached the team to a 2–1 record.

== Schedule ==
Date	Opponent*	Location	Time^{#}	Result	Overall	Conference
**Regular Season Games**
January 26, 1907	Des Moines Baptist	Away		**W 36–17**	1–0	
February 1, 1907	Des Moines Baptist	Away		**W 38–17**	2–0	
February 8, 1907	Simpson College	Away		**L 14–18**	2–1	
All times are in EST. Conference games in **BOLD**.
