= 1906–07 Colgate men's basketball team =

American college basketball season

1906–07 Colgate Raiders men's basketball
- Conference: Independent
- Record: 9–5
- Head coach: Ellery Huntington, Sr. (7th season)
- Captain: David Stowell
- Home arena: none

The 1906–07 Colgate Raiders men's basketball team represented Colgate University during the 1906–07 college men's basketball season. The head coach was Ellery Huntington Sr. coaching the Raiders in his seventh season. The team had finished with an overall record of 9–5.

== Schedule ==
| Date time, TV | Opponent | Result | Record | Site city, state |
|---|---|---|---|---|
| * | Union | W 67–14 | 1–0 | Hamilton, NY |
| * | Rochester | W 53–29 | 2–0 | Hamilton, NY |
| * | at Company E | L 25–48 | 2–1 | |
| * | at Army | W 30–17 | 3–1 | West Point, NY |
| * | at Wesleyan | L 25–29 | 3–2 | Middletown, CT |
| * | at Brown | W 23–12 | 4–2 | Providence, RI |
| * | Syracuse | W 34–18 | 5–2 | Hamilton, NY |
| * | Pennsylvania | L 26–32 | 5–3 | Hamilton, NY |
| * | at R.P.I. | W 36–21 | 6–3 | Rochester, NY |
| * | at Williams | L 09–41 | 6–4 | Williamstown, MA |
| * | Hamilton | W 37–21 | 7–4 | Hamilton, NY |
| * | at Syracuse | W 26–18 | 8–4 | Archbold Gymnasium; Syracuse, NY |
| * | at Rochester | L 14–39 | 8–5 | Rochester, NY |
| * | at Hamilton | W 32–18 | 9–5 | |
*Non-conference game. (#) Tournament seedings in parentheses.
