= 1906–07 Bucknell Bison men's basketball team =

American college basketball season

1906–07 Bucknell Bison men's basketball
- Conference: Independent
- Record: 10–1
- Head coach: Student coaches
- Captain: James Lose
- Home arena: none

The 1906–07 Bucknell Bison men's basketball team represented Bucknell University during the 1906–07 college men's basketball season. The Bisons' team captain was James Lose.

== Schedule ==
Date time, TV	Opponent	Result	Record	Site city, state
1/12/1907*	Susquehanna	W 40–29	1–0	Lewisburg, PA
1/18/1907*	Delaware	W 34–4	2–0	Lewisburg, PA
1/28/1907*	Bloomsburg	W 45–12	3–0	Lewisburg, PA
2/1/1907*	Gettysburg	W 42–12	4–0	Lewisburg, PA
2/9/1907*	NYU Law	W 35–9	5–0	Lewisburg, PA
2/14/1907*	Buffalo	W 38–11	6–0	Lewisburg, PA
2/21/1907*	Swarthmore	W 15–12	7–0	Lewisburg, PA
2/23/1907*	Alumni	W 20–16	8–0	Lewisburg, PA
3/1/1907*	Princeton Theo.	W 43–15	9–0	Lewisburg, PA
3/9/1907*	Dickinson Law	W 51–5	10–0	Lewisburg, PA
3/15/1907*	at H'burg Collegians	L 24–25	10–1	
*Non-conference game. (#) Tournament seedings in parentheses.
