= Oswald Tower =

American basketball administrator and instructor

Oswald Tower (November 23, 1883 – May 28, 1968) was an American basketball administrator and instructor at Phillips Academy Andover (1910–1949). Born in North Adams, Massachusetts, he served on the National Basketball Rules Committee from 1910 to 1960, was an editor of the Official Basketball Guide, and an official rules interpreter from 1915 to 1960. Tower was enshrined in the inaugural class of the Naismith Memorial Basketball Hall of Fame in 1959 as a contributor.
