= 1906–07 Kansas Jayhawks men's basketball team =

American college basketball season

1906–07 Kansas Jayhawks men's basketball
- Conference: Independent
- Record: 7–8
- Head coach: James Naismith (9th season)
- Captain: Milton Miller
- Home arena: Snow Hall

The 1906–07 Kansas Jayhawks men's basketball team represented the University of Kansas in its ninth season of collegiate basketball. The head coach was James Naismith, the inventor of the game, who served in his 9th year. Naismith would retire after the season. The Jayhawks finished the season 7–8. Phog Allen, who would later become the Jayhawks head coach, played on the team. The season marked the beginning of the Jayhawks two biggest rivalries, the Border War with Missouri and the Sunflower Showdown against Kansas State.

== Roster ==
- Ralph Bergen
- Phog Allen
- John Hackett
- George McCune
- Milton Miller
- William Miller
- Charles Siler
- Paul Wohler
- Earl Woodward

== Schedule ==
Date time, TV	Opponent	Result	Record	Site city, state
Jan. 12, 1907*	Lawrence YMCA	W 43–37	1–0	Lawrence, Kansas
Jan. 25, 1907*	Kansas State	W 54–39	2–0	Lawrence, Kansas
Feb. 8, 1907*	Ottawa (KS)	W 37–35	3–0	Lawrence, Kansas
Feb. 9, 1907*	Nebraska	L 19–32	3–1	Lawrence, Kansas
Feb. 11, 1907*	at Kansas State; Sunflower Showdown	L 25–29	3–2	Manhattan, Kansas
Feb. 12, 1907*	at Emporia State	W 35–20	4–2	Emporia, Kansas
Feb. 13, 1907*	at Newton YMCA	W 41–27	5–2	Newton, Kansas
Feb. 14, 1907*	at Baker	L 24–39	5–3	Baldwin, Kansas
Mar. 5, 1907*	at Warrensburg	W 34–16	6–3	Warrensburg, Missouri
Mar. 6, 1907*	at Kansas City AC	L 35–44	6–4	Kansas City, Missouri
Mar. 7, 1907*	at William Jewell	L 20–22	6–5	Liberty, Missouri
Mar. 8, 1907*	at Co. F, Independence	L 15–41	6–6	Independence, Missouri
Mar. 9, 1907*	Kirksville	W 65–21	7–6	Lawrence, Kansas
Mar. 11, 1907*	Missouri; Border War	L 31–34	7–7	Lawrence, Kansas
Mar. 12, 1907*	Missouri; Border War	L 12–34	7–8	Lawrence, Kansas
*Non-conference game. ^{#}Rankings from AP Poll. (#) Tournament seedings in parentheses. All times are in Central Standard Time.

== Popular culture ==
The Jayhawks March 11 game against Missouri, the first in the rivalry, was featured in the opening scene of the 2014 film Jayhawkers, as well as a conversation between James Naismith and Phog Allen about coaching after the game.
