= 1906–07 Missouri Tigers men's basketball team =

American college basketball season

1906–07 Missouri Tigers men's basketball
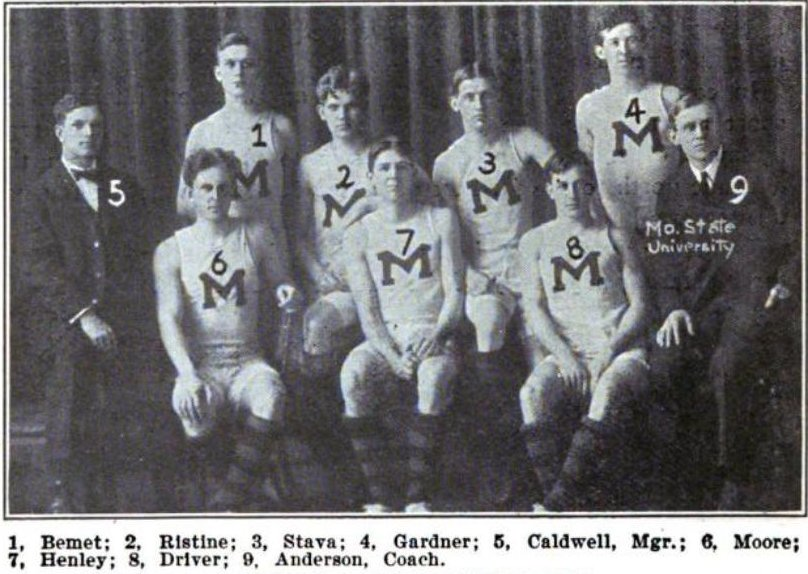
- Conference: Independent
- Record: 10–6
- Head coach: Dr. Isadore Anderson
- Home arena: Rothwell Gymnasium

The 1906–07 Missouri Tigers men's basketball team represented University of Missouri in the 1906–07 college basketball season. The team was led by first year head coach Dr. Isadore Anderson. The captain of the team was H.A. Henley. This was Missouri's first season of collegiate basketball. They finished with a 10–6 record.

== Schedule and results ==
Date time, TV	Rank^{#}	Opponent^{#}	Result	Record	Site city, state
January 12*		Central Methodist	W 47–21	1–0	Columbia, Missouri
January 18*		Washington (MO)	L 24–28	1–1	Columbia, Missouri
February 2*		at Kansas City Athletic Club	L 34–35	1–2	Kansas City, Missouri
February 4*		at Baker	L 28–43	1–3	Baldwin City, Kansas
February 5*		at Emporia State	W 40–26	2–3	Emporia, Kansas
February 6*		at Fort Riley	W 66–6	3–3	Fort Riley
February 7*		at Kansas State	L 19–34	3–4	Manhattan, Kansas
February 8*		at Haskell Institute	L 40–47	3–5	Lawrence, Kansas
February 9*		at Central Missouri	W 43–18	4–5	Warrensburg, Missouri
February 14*		at MO Athletic Club	W 35–19	5–5	St. Louis, Missouri
February 15*		at Washington (MO)	W 37–30	6–5	St. Louis, Missouri
March 2*		K.C. Athletic Club	W 46–26	7–5	Columbia, Missouri
March 11*		Kansas	W 34–31	8–5	Columbia, Missouri
March 12*		Kansas	W 34–12	9–5	Columbia, Missouri
March 19*		Haskell Institute	W 30–21	10–5	Columbia, Missouri
March 23*		MO Athletic Club	L 22–32	10–6	Columbia, Missouri
*Non-conference game. ^{#}Rankings from Coaches' Poll. (#) Tournament seedings in parentheses. All times are in Central Standard Time.
