= A. M. Ebright =

American athlete and coach (1881–1947)

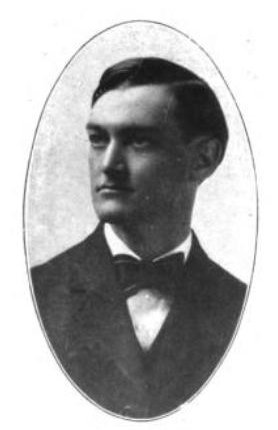

Biographical details
- Born: July 4, 1881; Rodney, Ohio, U.S.
- Died: October 16, 1947 (aged 66); Bartlesville, Oklahoma, U.S.

Coaching career (HC unless noted)

Basketball
- 1907–1908: Missouri

Baseball
- 1906–1908: Missouri
- 1909: Kansas

Head coaching record
- Overall: 8–10 (basketball); 42–35–2 (baseball)

Alpha Mills Ebright (July 4, 1881 – October 16, 1947) was an American basketball and baseball coach and a player of baseball. He served as the head basketball (1907–08) and baseball coach (1906–1908) at the University of Missouri, and head baseball coach at the University of Kansas (1909). After his coaching career, Ebright practiced law in Wichita, Kansas.

== See also ==
- 1907–08 Missouri Tigers men's basketball team
