= 1906–07 Penn State Nittany Lions basketball team =

American college basketball season

1906–07 Penn State Nittany Lions men's basketball
- Conference: Independent
- Record: 5–6
- Head coach: student coaches
- Captain: H.B. Waha
- Home arena: Armory

The 1906–07 Penn State Nittany Lions basketball team represented Penn State University during the 1906–07 college men's basketball season. The team finished with a final record of 5–6.

== Schedule ==
| Date time, TV | Opponent | Result | Record | Site city, state |
|---|---|---|---|---|
| 12/13/1906* | Juniata | W 62–1 | 1–0 | |
| 1/11/1907* | Wyoming Seminary | W 66–23 | 2–0 | |
| 2/8/1907* | NYULS | W 19–17 | 3–0 | |
| 2/11/1907* | at Harrisburg Athletic Club | L 29–45 | 3–1 | |
| 2/12/1907* | at Swarthmore | L 15–26 | 3–2 | |
| 2/13/1907* | at Pennsylvania | L 16–35 | 3–3 | |
| 2/14/1907* | at Lehigh | L 12–40 | 3–4 | |
| 2/15/1907* | Army | L 16–32 | 3–5 | |
| 2/16/1907* | Fordham | L 12–15 | 3–6 | |
| 2/22/1907* | at Swarthmore | W 22–20 | 4–6 | |
| 3/1/1907* | at Lebanon Valley | W 52–20 | 5–6 | |
*Non-conference game. (#) Tournament seedings in parentheses.
