= 1908–09 Tennessee Volunteers basketball team =

American college basketball season

1908–09 Tennessee Volunteers men's basketball
- Conference: Independent
- Record: 2–5
- Head coach: none
- Captain: Nathan Dougherty

1908–09 IAAUS men's basketball independents standings
| | Conf. | | | | Overall |
| Team | W | | L | PCT | W | | L | PCT |
|---|---|---|---|---|---|---|---|---|
| California | | – | | – | 10 | – | 0 | 1.000 |
| Illinois State | | – | | – | 9 | – | 0 | 1.000 |
| New Mexico | | – | | – | 1 | – | 0 | 1.000 |
| New York University | | – | | – | 13 | – | 0 | 1.000 |
| Swarthmore | | – | | – | 12 | – | 0 | 1.000 |
| Whittier | | – | | – | 14 | – | 0 | 1.000 |
| Widener | | – | | – | 9 | – | 0 | 1.000 |
| Columbia | | – | | – | 15 | – | 1 | .938 |
| Williams | | – | | – | 13 | – | 1 | .929 |
| Grinnell | | – | | – | 12 | – | 1 | .923 |
| Ohio State | | – | | – | 11 | – | 1 | .917 |
| Oregon Agricultural | | – | | – | 10 | – | 1 | .909 |
| Trinity (N.C.) | | – | | – | 8 | – | 1 | .889 |
| Hope | | – | | – | 8 | – | 1 | .889 |
| Montana State | | – | | – | 8 | – | 1 | .889 |
| Dayton | | – | | – | 12 | – | 2 | .857 |
| Wake Forest | | – | | – | 6 | – | 1 | .857 |
| Allegheny | | – | | – | 11 | – | 2 | .846 |
| North Dakota | | – | | – | 10 | – | 2 | .833 |
| Washington | | – | | – | 5 | – | 1 | .833 |
| Wooster | | – | | – | 10 | – | 2 | .833 |
| Notre Dame | | – | | – | 33 | – | 7 | .825 |
| Army | | – | | – | 9 | – | 2 | .818 |
| Nebraska Wesleyan | | – | | – | 11 | – | 3 | .786 |
| New Mexico A&M | | – | | – | 7 | – | 2 | .778 |
| Rhode Island A&M | | – | | – | 7 | – | 2 | .778 |
| Pennsylvania | | – | | – | 19 | – | 6 | .760 |
| Bucknell | | – | | – | 9 | – | 3 | .750 |
| Wabash | | – | | – | 9 | – | 3 | .750 |
| North Dakota Agricultural | | – | | – | 11 | – | 4 | .733 |
| CCNY | | – | | – | 8 | – | 3 | .727 |
| Navy | | – | | – | 8 | – | 3 | .727 |
| Southern California | | – | | – | 8 | – | 3 | .727 |
| Temple | | – | | – | 8 | – | 3 | .727 |
| Butler | | – | | – | 5 | – | 2 | .714 |
| Seton Hall | | – | | – | 10 | – | 4 | .714 |
| Loyola (Md.) | | – | | – | 12 | – | 5 | .706 |
| St. Lawrence | | – | | – | 12 | – | 2 | .857 |
| Maine | | – | | – | 7 | – | 3 | .700 |
| Marietta | | – | | – | 7 | – | 3 | .700 |
| William & Mary | | – | | – | 7 | – | 3 | .700 |
| Baylor | | – | | – | 11 | – | 5 | .688 |
| Dartmouth | | – | | – | 11 | – | 5 | .688 |
| Kansas State | | – | | – | 6 | – | 3 | .667 |
| Michigan State | | – | | – | 10 | – | 5 | .667 |
| Southwestern (Kan.) | | – | | – | 6 | – | 3 | .667 |
| Texas | | – | | – | 6 | – | 3 | .667 |
| Virginia | | – | | – | 6 | – | 3 | .667 |
| Virginia Tech | | – | | – | 4 | – | 2 | .667 |
| Denison | | – | | – | 11 | – | 6 | .647 |
| Georgetown | | – | | – | 9 | – | 5 | .643 |
| Brigham Young | | – | | – | 7 | – | 4 | .636 |
| MIT | | – | | – | 10 | – | 6 | .625 |
| Washington State | | – | | – | 10 | – | 6 | .625 |
| Cincinnati | | – | | – | 6 | – | 4 | .600 |
| Grove City | | – | | – | 9 | – | 6 | .600 |
| St. John's (NY) | | – | | – | 9 | – | 6 | .600 |
| Colorado | | – | | – | 4 | – | 3 | .571 |
| Franklin | | – | | – | 12 | – | 9 | .571 |
| Santa Clara | | – | | – | 4 | – | 3 | .571 |
| Cornell | | – | | – | 13 | – | 10 | .565 |
| Kentucky | | – | | – | 5 | – | 4 | .556 |
| Washington and Lee | | – | | – | 5 | – | 4 | .556 |
| Bloomsburg | | – | | – | 6 | – | 5 | .545 |
| Washburn | | – | | – | 6 | – | 5 | .545 |
| Colgate | | – | | – | 7 | – | 6 | .538 |
| Penn State | | – | | – | 7 | – | 6 | .538 |
| Fordham | | – | | – | 13 | – | 12 | .520 |
| Arizona | | – | | – | 1 | – | 1 | .500 |
| Lehigh | | – | | – | 5 | – | 5 | .500 |
| Ohio | | – | | – | 1 | – | 1 | .500 |
| Oklahoma | | – | | – | 3 | – | 3 | .500 |
| VMI | | – | | – | 3 | – | 3 | .500 |
| Wisconsin–Stevens Point | | – | | – | 4 | – | 4 | .500 |
| Wyoming | | – | | – | 3 | – | 3 | .500 |
| Yale | | – | | – | 9 | – | 9 | .500 |
| Syracuse | | – | | – | 7 | – | 8 | .467 |
| Akron | | – | | – | 6 | – | 7 | .462 |
| Bradley | | – | | – | 6 | – | 7 | .462 |
| Gettysburg | | – | | – | 4 | – | 5 | .444 |
| Wesleyan (Conn.) | | – | | – | 7 | – | 9 | .438 |
| Canisius | | – | | – | 3 | – | 4 | .429 |
| Idaho | | – | | – | 7 | – | 10 | .412 |
| Miami (Ohio) | | – | | – | 4 | – | 6 | .400 |
| Westminster (Pa.) | | – | | – | 4 | – | 6 | .400 |
| Fairmount | | – | | – | 4 | – | 6 | .400 |
| Mount Union | | – | | – | 7 | – | 11 | .389 |
| Princeton | | – | | – | 8 | – | 13 | .381 |
| Denver | | – | | – | 6 | – | 10 | .375 |
| Delaware | | – | | – | 4 | – | 7 | .364 |
| Brown | | – | | – | 5 | – | 10 | .333 |
| Davidson | | – | | – | 1 | – | 2 | .333 |
| Holy Cross | | – | | – | 4 | – | 8 | .333 |
| Lake Forest | | – | | – | 3 | – | 6 | .333 |
| Oklahoma A&M | | – | | – | 1 | – | 2 | .333 |
| Tulane | | – | | – | 3 | – | 7 | .300 |
| Manhattan | | – | | – | 4 | – | 10 | .286 |
| Springfield (Mass.) | | – | | – | 2 | – | 5 | .286 |
| Utah | | – | | – | 3 | – | 8 | .273 |
| Indiana State | | – | | – | 2 | – | 7 | .222 |
| Niagara | | – | | – | 2 | – | 7 | .222 |
| Trinity (Conn.) | | – | | – | 2 | – | 7 | .222 |
| Union (N.Y.) | | – | | – | 2 | – | 8 | .200 |
| Harvard | | – | | – | 1 | – | 7 | .125 |
| Utah State | | – | | – | 1 | – | 8 | .111 |
| Kalamazoo | | – | | – | 0 | – | 3 | .000 |
| South Carolina | | – | | – | 0 | – | 3 | .000 |

The 1908–09 Tennessee Volunteers basketball team represented the University of Tennessee during the 1908–09 college men's basketball season. The Volunteers team captain was Nathan Dougherty.

== Schedule ==
| Date time, TV | Opponent | Result | Record | Site city, state |
|---|---|---|---|---|
| January 22, 1909* | at Asheville YCA | L 10–20 | 0–1 | Asheville, NC |
| January 23, 1909* | at Asheville School | L 19–29 | 0–2 | Asheville, NC |
| January 27, 1909* | TSD | W 55–16 | 1–2 | Knoxville, TN |
| January 28, 1909* | at Carson Newman | L 21–29 | 1–3 | Jefferson City, TN |
| January 29, 1909* | at Bristol YMCA | L 31–47 | 1–4 | Bristol, TN |
| January 30, 1909* | at Bristol YMCA | L 24–28 | 1–5 | Bristol, TN |
| February 4, 1909* | at TMI | W 21–20 | 2–5 | Sweetwater, TN |
*Non-conference game. (#) Tournament seedings in parentheses.
