= 1908–09 South Carolina Gamecocks men's basketball team =

American college basketball season

1908–09 South Carolina Gamecocks men's basketball
- Conference: Independent
- Record: 0–3
- Head coach: J.H. Brown (1st season)
- Home arena: none

1908–09 IAAUS men's basketball independents standings
	Conf.				Overall
Team	W		L	PCT	W		L	PCT
California		–		–	10	–	0	1.000
Illinois State		–		–	9	–	0	1.000
New Mexico		–		–	1	–	0	1.000
New York University		–		–	13	–	0	1.000
Swarthmore		–		–	12	–	0	1.000
Whittier		–		–	14	–	0	1.000
Widener		–		–	9	–	0	1.000
Columbia		–		–	15	–	1	.938
Williams		–		–	13	–	1	.929
Grinnell		–		–	12	–	1	.923
Ohio State		–		–	11	–	1	.917
Oregon Agricultural		–		–	10	–	1	.909
Trinity (N.C.)		–		–	8	–	1	.889
Hope		–		–	8	–	1	.889
Montana State		–		–	8	–	1	.889
Dayton		–		–	12	–	2	.857
Wake Forest		–		–	6	–	1	.857
Allegheny		–		–	11	–	2	.846
North Dakota		–		–	10	–	2	.833
Washington		–		–	5	–	1	.833
Wooster		–		–	10	–	2	.833
Notre Dame		–		–	33	–	7	.825
Army		–		–	9	–	2	.818
Nebraska Wesleyan		–		–	11	–	3	.786
New Mexico A&M		–		–	7	–	2	.778
Rhode Island A&M		–		–	7	–	2	.778
Pennsylvania		–		–	19	–	6	.760
Bucknell		–		–	9	–	3	.750
Wabash		–		–	9	–	3	.750
North Dakota Agricultural		–		–	11	–	4	.733
CCNY		–		–	8	–	3	.727
Navy		–		–	8	–	3	.727
Southern California		–		–	8	–	3	.727
Temple		–		–	8	–	3	.727
Butler		–		–	5	–	2	.714
Seton Hall		–		–	10	–	4	.714
Loyola (Md.)		–		–	12	–	5	.706
St. Lawrence		–		–	12	–	2	.857
Maine		–		–	7	–	3	.700
Marietta		–		–	7	–	3	.700
William & Mary		–		–	7	–	3	.700
Baylor		–		–	11	–	5	.688
Dartmouth		–		–	11	–	5	.688
Kansas State		–		–	6	–	3	.667
Michigan State		–		–	10	–	5	.667
Southwestern (Kan.)		–		–	6	–	3	.667
Texas		–		–	6	–	3	.667
Virginia		–		–	6	–	3	.667
Virginia Tech		–		–	4	–	2	.667
Denison		–		–	11	–	6	.647
Georgetown		–		–	9	–	5	.643
Brigham Young		–		–	7	–	4	.636
MIT		–		–	10	–	6	.625
Washington State		–		–	10	–	6	.625
Cincinnati		–		–	6	–	4	.600
Grove City		–		–	9	–	6	.600
St. John's (NY)		–		–	9	–	6	.600
Colorado		–		–	4	–	3	.571
Franklin		–		–	12	–	9	.571
Santa Clara		–		–	4	–	3	.571
Cornell		–		–	13	–	10	.565
Kentucky		–		–	5	–	4	.556
Washington and Lee		–		–	5	–	4	.556
Bloomsburg		–		–	6	–	5	.545
Washburn		–		–	6	–	5	.545
Colgate		–		–	7	–	6	.538
Penn State		–		–	7	–	6	.538
Fordham		–		–	13	–	12	.520
Arizona		–		–	1	–	1	.500
Lehigh		–		–	5	–	5	.500
Ohio		–		–	1	–	1	.500
Oklahoma		–		–	3	–	3	.500
VMI		–		–	3	–	3	.500
Wisconsin–Stevens Point		–		–	4	–	4	.500
Wyoming		–		–	3	–	3	.500
Yale		–		–	9	–	9	.500
Syracuse		–		–	7	–	8	.467
Akron		–		–	6	–	7	.462
Bradley		–		–	6	–	7	.462
Gettysburg		–		–	4	–	5	.444
Wesleyan (Conn.)		–		–	7	–	9	.438
Canisius		–		–	3	–	4	.429
Idaho		–		–	7	–	10	.412
Miami (Ohio)		–		–	4	–	6	.400
Westminster (Pa.)		–		–	4	–	6	.400
Fairmount		–		–	4	–	6	.400
Mount Union		–		–	7	–	11	.389
Princeton		–		–	8	–	13	.381
Denver		–		–	6	–	10	.375
Delaware		–		–	4	–	7	.364
Brown		–		–	5	–	10	.333
Davidson		–		–	1	–	2	.333
Holy Cross		–		–	4	–	8	.333
Lake Forest		–		–	3	–	6	.333
Oklahoma A&M		–		–	1	–	2	.333
Tulane		–		–	3	–	7	.300
Manhattan		–		–	4	–	10	.286
Springfield (Mass.)		–		–	2	–	5	.286
Utah		–		–	3	–	8	.273
Indiana State		–		–	2	–	7	.222
Niagara		–		–	2	–	7	.222
Trinity (Conn.)		–		–	2	–	7	.222
Union (N.Y.)		–		–	2	–	8	.200
Harvard		–		–	1	–	7	.125
Utah State		–		–	1	–	8	.111
Kalamazoo		–		–	0	–	3	.000
South Carolina		–		–	0	–	3	.000

The 1908–09 South Carolina men's basketball team represented University of South Carolina during the 1908–09 college men's basketball season. The head coach was J.H. Brown, coaching the Gamecocks in his first season. The team finished with an overall record of 0–3.

== Schedule ==
Date time, TV	Opponent	Result	Record	Site city, state
10/30/1908*	Furman	L 19–21	0–1	
12/19/1908*	Columbia YMCA	L 21–37	0–2	
2/25/1909*	Wofford	L 18–23	0–3	
*Non-conference game. (#) Tournament seedings in parentheses.
