= 1908–09 Colgate men's basketball team =

American college basketball season

1908–09 Colgate Raiders men's basketball
- Conference: Independent
- Record: 7–6
- Head coach: Ellery Huntington, Sr. (8th season)
- Captain: Herb Coster
- Home arena: none

1908–09 IAAUS men's basketball independents standings
| | Conf. | | | | Overall |
| Team | W | | L | PCT | W | | L | PCT |
|---|---|---|---|---|---|---|---|---|
| California | | – | | – | 10 | – | 0 | 1.000 |
| Illinois State | | – | | – | 9 | – | 0 | 1.000 |
| New Mexico | | – | | – | 1 | – | 0 | 1.000 |
| New York University | | – | | – | 13 | – | 0 | 1.000 |
| Swarthmore | | – | | – | 12 | – | 0 | 1.000 |
| Whittier | | – | | – | 14 | – | 0 | 1.000 |
| Widener | | – | | – | 9 | – | 0 | 1.000 |
| Columbia | | – | | – | 15 | – | 1 | .938 |
| Williams | | – | | – | 13 | – | 1 | .929 |
| Grinnell | | – | | – | 12 | – | 1 | .923 |
| Ohio State | | – | | – | 11 | – | 1 | .917 |
| Oregon Agricultural | | – | | – | 10 | – | 1 | .909 |
| Trinity (N.C.) | | – | | – | 8 | – | 1 | .889 |
| Hope | | – | | – | 8 | – | 1 | .889 |
| Montana State | | – | | – | 8 | – | 1 | .889 |
| Dayton | | – | | – | 12 | – | 2 | .857 |
| Wake Forest | | – | | – | 6 | – | 1 | .857 |
| Allegheny | | – | | – | 11 | – | 2 | .846 |
| North Dakota | | – | | – | 10 | – | 2 | .833 |
| Washington | | – | | – | 5 | – | 1 | .833 |
| Wooster | | – | | – | 10 | – | 2 | .833 |
| Notre Dame | | – | | – | 33 | – | 7 | .825 |
| Army | | – | | – | 9 | – | 2 | .818 |
| Nebraska Wesleyan | | – | | – | 11 | – | 3 | .786 |
| New Mexico A&M | | – | | – | 7 | – | 2 | .778 |
| Rhode Island A&M | | – | | – | 7 | – | 2 | .778 |
| Pennsylvania | | – | | – | 19 | – | 6 | .760 |
| Bucknell | | – | | – | 9 | – | 3 | .750 |
| Wabash | | – | | – | 9 | – | 3 | .750 |
| North Dakota Agricultural | | – | | – | 11 | – | 4 | .733 |
| CCNY | | – | | – | 8 | – | 3 | .727 |
| Navy | | – | | – | 8 | – | 3 | .727 |
| Southern California | | – | | – | 8 | – | 3 | .727 |
| Temple | | – | | – | 8 | – | 3 | .727 |
| Butler | | – | | – | 5 | – | 2 | .714 |
| Seton Hall | | – | | – | 10 | – | 4 | .714 |
| Loyola (Md.) | | – | | – | 12 | – | 5 | .706 |
| St. Lawrence | | – | | – | 12 | – | 2 | .857 |
| Maine | | – | | – | 7 | – | 3 | .700 |
| Marietta | | – | | – | 7 | – | 3 | .700 |
| William & Mary | | – | | – | 7 | – | 3 | .700 |
| Baylor | | – | | – | 11 | – | 5 | .688 |
| Dartmouth | | – | | – | 11 | – | 5 | .688 |
| Kansas State | | – | | – | 6 | – | 3 | .667 |
| Michigan State | | – | | – | 10 | – | 5 | .667 |
| Southwestern (Kan.) | | – | | – | 6 | – | 3 | .667 |
| Texas | | – | | – | 6 | – | 3 | .667 |
| Virginia | | – | | – | 6 | – | 3 | .667 |
| Virginia Tech | | – | | – | 4 | – | 2 | .667 |
| Denison | | – | | – | 11 | – | 6 | .647 |
| Georgetown | | – | | – | 9 | – | 5 | .643 |
| Brigham Young | | – | | – | 7 | – | 4 | .636 |
| MIT | | – | | – | 10 | – | 6 | .625 |
| Washington State | | – | | – | 10 | – | 6 | .625 |
| Cincinnati | | – | | – | 6 | – | 4 | .600 |
| Grove City | | – | | – | 9 | – | 6 | .600 |
| St. John's (NY) | | – | | – | 9 | – | 6 | .600 |
| Colorado | | – | | – | 4 | – | 3 | .571 |
| Franklin | | – | | – | 12 | – | 9 | .571 |
| Santa Clara | | – | | – | 4 | – | 3 | .571 |
| Cornell | | – | | – | 13 | – | 10 | .565 |
| Kentucky | | – | | – | 5 | – | 4 | .556 |
| Washington and Lee | | – | | – | 5 | – | 4 | .556 |
| Bloomsburg | | – | | – | 6 | – | 5 | .545 |
| Washburn | | – | | – | 6 | – | 5 | .545 |
| Colgate | | – | | – | 7 | – | 6 | .538 |
| Penn State | | – | | – | 7 | – | 6 | .538 |
| Fordham | | – | | – | 13 | – | 12 | .520 |
| Arizona | | – | | – | 1 | – | 1 | .500 |
| Lehigh | | – | | – | 5 | – | 5 | .500 |
| Ohio | | – | | – | 1 | – | 1 | .500 |
| Oklahoma | | – | | – | 3 | – | 3 | .500 |
| VMI | | – | | – | 3 | – | 3 | .500 |
| Wisconsin–Stevens Point | | – | | – | 4 | – | 4 | .500 |
| Wyoming | | – | | – | 3 | – | 3 | .500 |
| Yale | | – | | – | 9 | – | 9 | .500 |
| Syracuse | | – | | – | 7 | – | 8 | .467 |
| Akron | | – | | – | 6 | – | 7 | .462 |
| Bradley | | – | | – | 6 | – | 7 | .462 |
| Gettysburg | | – | | – | 4 | – | 5 | .444 |
| Wesleyan (Conn.) | | – | | – | 7 | – | 9 | .438 |
| Canisius | | – | | – | 3 | – | 4 | .429 |
| Idaho | | – | | – | 7 | – | 10 | .412 |
| Miami (Ohio) | | – | | – | 4 | – | 6 | .400 |
| Westminster (Pa.) | | – | | – | 4 | – | 6 | .400 |
| Fairmount | | – | | – | 4 | – | 6 | .400 |
| Mount Union | | – | | – | 7 | – | 11 | .389 |
| Princeton | | – | | – | 8 | – | 13 | .381 |
| Denver | | – | | – | 6 | – | 10 | .375 |
| Delaware | | – | | – | 4 | – | 7 | .364 |
| Brown | | – | | – | 5 | – | 10 | .333 |
| Davidson | | – | | – | 1 | – | 2 | .333 |
| Holy Cross | | – | | – | 4 | – | 8 | .333 |
| Lake Forest | | – | | – | 3 | – | 6 | .333 |
| Oklahoma A&M | | – | | – | 1 | – | 2 | .333 |
| Tulane | | – | | – | 3 | – | 7 | .300 |
| Manhattan | | – | | – | 4 | – | 10 | .286 |
| Springfield (Mass.) | | – | | – | 2 | – | 5 | .286 |
| Utah | | – | | – | 3 | – | 8 | .273 |
| Indiana State | | – | | – | 2 | – | 7 | .222 |
| Niagara | | – | | – | 2 | – | 7 | .222 |
| Trinity (Conn.) | | – | | – | 2 | – | 7 | .222 |
| Union (N.Y.) | | – | | – | 2 | – | 8 | .200 |
| Harvard | | – | | – | 1 | – | 7 | .125 |
| Utah State | | – | | – | 1 | – | 8 | .111 |
| Kalamazoo | | – | | – | 0 | – | 3 | .000 |
| South Carolina | | – | | – | 0 | – | 3 | .000 |

The 1908–09 Colgate Raiders men's basketball team represented Colgate University during the 1908–09 college men's basketball season. The head coach was Ellery Huntington Sr. coaching the Raiders in his ninth season. The team had finished with a final record of 7–6. The team captain was Herb Coster.

== Schedule ==
| Date time, TV | Opponent | Result | Record | Site city, state |
|---|---|---|---|---|
| * | Pennsylvania | L 16–23 | 0–1 | Hamilton, NY |
| * | Rochester | W 31–26 | 1–1 | Hamilton, NY |
| * | at Syracuse | L 21–22 | 1–2 | Archbold Gymnasium; Syracuse, NY |
| * | at Rochester | L 11–18 | 1–3 | Rochester, NY |
| * | Oberlin | W 43–24 | 2–3 | Hamilton, NY |
| * | at Hamilton | W 31–29 | 3–3 | |
| * | at Utica Separate Co | W 26–21 | 4–3 | |
| * | at RPI | L 19–23 | 4–4 | |
| * | at Army | L 23–27 | 4–5 | West Point, NY |
| * | at Pennsylvania | L 23–27 | 4–6 | Philadelphia, PA |
| * | at Binghamton YMCA | W 51–23 | 5–6 | |
| * | Hamilton | W 53–21 | 6–6 | Hamilton, NY |
| * | Syracuse | W 35–25 | 7–6 | Hamilton, NY |
*Non-conference game. (#) Tournament seedings in parentheses.
