= 1908–09 Georgetown Hoyas men's basketball team =

American college basketball season

1908–09 Georgetown Hoyas men's basketball

Champions of the South
- Conference: Independent
- Record: 9–5
- Head coach: Maurice Joyce (2nd season)
- Captain: Fred Rice
- Home arena: Odd Fellows Hall

1908–09 IAAUS men's basketball independents standings
	Conf.				Overall
Team	W		L	PCT	W		L	PCT
California		–		–	10	–	0	1.000
Illinois State		–		–	9	–	0	1.000
New Mexico		–		–	1	–	0	1.000
New York University		–		–	13	–	0	1.000
Swarthmore		–		–	12	–	0	1.000
Whittier		–		–	14	–	0	1.000
Widener		–		–	9	–	0	1.000
Columbia		–		–	15	–	1	.938
Williams		–		–	13	–	1	.929
Grinnell		–		–	12	–	1	.923
Ohio State		–		–	11	–	1	.917
Oregon Agricultural		–		–	10	–	1	.909
Trinity (N.C.)		–		–	8	–	1	.889
Hope		–		–	8	–	1	.889
Montana State		–		–	8	–	1	.889
Dayton		–		–	12	–	2	.857
Wake Forest		–		–	6	–	1	.857
Allegheny		–		–	11	–	2	.846
North Dakota		–		–	10	–	2	.833
Washington		–		–	5	–	1	.833
Wooster		–		–	10	–	2	.833
Notre Dame		–		–	33	–	7	.825
Army		–		–	9	–	2	.818
Nebraska Wesleyan		–		–	11	–	3	.786
New Mexico A&M		–		–	7	–	2	.778
Rhode Island A&M		–		–	7	–	2	.778
Pennsylvania		–		–	19	–	6	.760
Bucknell		–		–	9	–	3	.750
Wabash		–		–	9	–	3	.750
North Dakota Agricultural		–		–	11	–	4	.733
CCNY		–		–	8	–	3	.727
Navy		–		–	8	–	3	.727
Southern California		–		–	8	–	3	.727
Temple		–		–	8	–	3	.727
Butler		–		–	5	–	2	.714
Seton Hall		–		–	10	–	4	.714
Loyola (Md.)		–		–	12	–	5	.706
St. Lawrence		–		–	12	–	2	.857
Maine		–		–	7	–	3	.700
Marietta		–		–	7	–	3	.700
William & Mary		–		–	7	–	3	.700
Baylor		–		–	11	–	5	.688
Dartmouth		–		–	11	–	5	.688
Kansas State		–		–	6	–	3	.667
Michigan State		–		–	10	–	5	.667
Southwestern (Kan.)		–		–	6	–	3	.667
Texas		–		–	6	–	3	.667
Virginia		–		–	6	–	3	.667
Virginia Tech		–		–	4	–	2	.667
Denison		–		–	11	–	6	.647
Georgetown		–		–	9	–	5	.643
Brigham Young		–		–	7	–	4	.636
MIT		–		–	10	–	6	.625
Washington State		–		–	10	–	6	.625
Cincinnati		–		–	6	–	4	.600
Grove City		–		–	9	–	6	.600
St. John's (NY)		–		–	9	–	6	.600
Colorado		–		–	4	–	3	.571
Franklin		–		–	12	–	9	.571
Santa Clara		–		–	4	–	3	.571
Cornell		–		–	13	–	10	.565
Kentucky		–		–	5	–	4	.556
Washington and Lee		–		–	5	–	4	.556
Bloomsburg		–		–	6	–	5	.545
Washburn		–		–	6	–	5	.545
Colgate		–		–	7	–	6	.538
Penn State		–		–	7	–	6	.538
Fordham		–		–	13	–	12	.520
Arizona		–		–	1	–	1	.500
Lehigh		–		–	5	–	5	.500
Ohio		–		–	1	–	1	.500
Oklahoma		–		–	3	–	3	.500
VMI		–		–	3	–	3	.500
Wisconsin–Stevens Point		–		–	4	–	4	.500
Wyoming		–		–	3	–	3	.500
Yale		–		–	9	–	9	.500
Syracuse		–		–	7	–	8	.467
Akron		–		–	6	–	7	.462
Bradley		–		–	6	–	7	.462
Gettysburg		–		–	4	–	5	.444
Wesleyan (Conn.)		–		–	7	–	9	.438
Canisius		–		–	3	–	4	.429
Idaho		–		–	7	–	10	.412
Miami (Ohio)		–		–	4	–	6	.400
Westminster (Pa.)		–		–	4	–	6	.400
Fairmount		–		–	4	–	6	.400
Mount Union		–		–	7	–	11	.389
Princeton		–		–	8	–	13	.381
Denver		–		–	6	–	10	.375
Delaware		–		–	4	–	7	.364
Brown		–		–	5	–	10	.333
Davidson		–		–	1	–	2	.333
Holy Cross		–		–	4	–	8	.333
Lake Forest		–		–	3	–	6	.333
Oklahoma A&M		–		–	1	–	2	.333
Tulane		–		–	3	–	7	.300
Manhattan		–		–	4	–	10	.286
Springfield (Mass.)		–		–	2	–	5	.286
Utah		–		–	3	–	8	.273
Indiana State		–		–	2	–	7	.222
Niagara		–		–	2	–	7	.222
Trinity (Conn.)		–		–	2	–	7	.222
Union (N.Y.)		–		–	2	–	8	.200
Harvard		–		–	1	–	7	.125
Utah State		–		–	1	–	8	.111
Kalamazoo		–		–	0	–	3	.000
South Carolina		–		–	0	–	3	.000

The 1908–09 Georgetown Hoyas men's basketball team represented Georgetown University during the 1908–09 Intercollegiate Athletic Association of the United States college basketball season. Maurice Joyce coached the team in his second season as head coach. Georgetown was an independent and – after its home opener at the Convention Hall at 5th and K Streets NW in downtown Washington, D.C., where it had played home games the previous season – played its home games at the Odd Fellows Hall at 8th and D Streets NW in downtown Washington. The team finished the season with a record of 9–5.

== Season recap ==
Freshman forward-center Frank Schlosser joined the team this season and played in all 14 games, immediately establishing himself as a scoring mainstay. He led the team in scoring, as he would in all four years of his career; this season he scored 128 points, averaging 9.1 points per game.

Georgetown University Law School student and forward Fred Rice was in his second season with the Hoyas. He started all 14 games the Hoyas played, scoring 34 field goals and shooting 42-for-75 (56.0%) from the free-throw line for a total of 110 points and a 7.9 points per game. He finished second only to Schlosser in scoring for the year.

The team's nine wins this season included victories over basketball powers Virginia, Navy, and Penn State. Walter C. Foster, writing for Spalding's Official Collegiate Basket Ball Guide for 1910–1911, picked Georgetown as the recipient of the mythical title of "Champions of the South" for the 1908–09 season.

== Roster ==
Georgetown players did not wear numbers on their jerseys this season. The first numbered jerseys in Georgetown men's basketball history would not appear until the 1933-34 season.

Forward James Colliflower, a Georgetown University Law School student and three-season letterman in his second of three years playing with the team, would later serve as Georgetown's head coach during the 1911–12, 1912–13, 1913–14, and 1921–22 seasons.

Name	Height	Weight (lbs.)	Position	Class	Hometown	Previous Team(s)
George Colliflower	N/A	N/A	F	Grad. Stud.	Washington, DC, U.S.	Georgetown Preparatory School (North Bethesda, MD)
James Colliflower	N/A	N/A	F	Grad. Stud.	Washington, DC, U.S.	Georgetown Preparatory School (North Bethesda, MD)
Richard Downey	N/A	N/A	C	Grad. Stud.	N/A	N/A
George Goggin	N/A	N/A	G	Jr.	N/A	N/A
George Keliher	N/A	N/A	F	Jr.	Washington, DC, U.S.	United States Army
Richard Kingsley	N/A	N/A	G	N/A	Washington, DC, U.S.	Georgetown Preparatory School (North Bethesda, MD)
Fred Rice	N/A	N/A	C	Grad. Stud.	Washington, DC, U.S.	George Washington University
Frank Schlosser	N/A	N/A	C	Fr.	Washington, DC, U.S.	United States Army
Billy Sitterding	N/A	N/A	G	Fr.	Richmond, VA, U.S.	N/A

== 1908–09 schedule and results ==
It was common practice at this time for colleges and universities to include non-collegiate opponents in their schedules, with the games recognized as part of their official record for the season, and the games against the Washington YMCA all counted as part of Georgetown's won-loss record for 1908–09. It was not until 1952, after the completion of the 1951–52 season, that the National Collegiate Athletic Association (NCAA) ruled that colleges and universities could no longer count games played against non-collegiate opponents in their annual won-loss records.

Georgetown met Navy for the first time this season, playing the Midshipmen three times and winning two of the games. It was the last success Georgetown would have against Navy until 1928; the Hoyas would lose 15 straight games to the Midshipmen in the interim.

Date time, TV	Opponent	Result	Record	Site city, state
Regular Season
Thu., Dec. 17, 1908 no, no	Penn State	W 49–22	1-0	Convention Hall; Washington, DC
Sat., Dec. 19, 1908 no, no	at Navy	L 32–33	1-1	Dahlgren Hall; Annapolis, MD
Sat., Dec. 26, 1908 no, no	at Washington YMCA	L 22–37	1-2	YMCA Hall; Washington, DC
Mon., Dec. 28, 1908 no, no	Columbia	cancelled		Odd Fellows Hall; Washington, DC
Sat., Jan. 2, 1909 no, no	at Navy	W 26–24	2-2	Dahlgren Hall; Annapolis, MD
Mon., Jan. 4, 1909 no, no	Vanderbilt	cancelled		Odd Fellows Hall; Washington, DC
Sat., Jan. 9, 1909 no, no	Fordham	cancelled		Odd Fellows Hall; Washington, DC
Sat., Jan. 9, 1909 no, no	at Washington YMCA	W 28–21	3-2	YMCA Hall; Washington, DC
Sat., Jan. 16, 1909 no, no	Swarthmore	cancelled		Odd Fellows Hall; Washington, DC
Sat., Jan. 23, 1909 no, no	at Navy	W 26–23	4-2	Dahlgren Hall; Annapolis, MD
Wed., Jan. 27, 1909 no, no	at Washington YMCA	L 23–33	4-3	YMCA Hall; Washington, DC
Sat., Jan. 30, 1909 no, no	at Virginia	W 35–24	5-3	Fayerweather Gymnasium; Charlottesville, VA
Wed., Feb. 3, 1909 no, no	at Columbia	L 10–23	5-4	University Heights Gymnasium; New York, NY
Sat., Feb. 6, 1909 no, no	Washington and Lee	W 60–15	6-4	Odd Fellows Hall; Washington, DC
Sat., Feb. 13, 1909 no, no	at Loyola	W 62–25	7-4	5th Regiment Armory; Baltimore, MD
Mon., Feb. 22, 1909 no, no	Fordham	W 27–19	8-4	Odd Fellows Hall; Washington, DC
Fri., Feb. 26, 1909 no, no	at Cornell	L 21–22	8-5	N/A; Ithaca, NY
Sat., Feb. 27, 1909 no, no	Virginia	W 36–19	9-5	Odd Fellows Hall; Washington, DC
*Non-conference game. (#) Tournament seedings in parentheses.
