= 1908–09 VMI Keydets basketball team =

American college basketball season

1908–09 VMI Keydets men's basketball
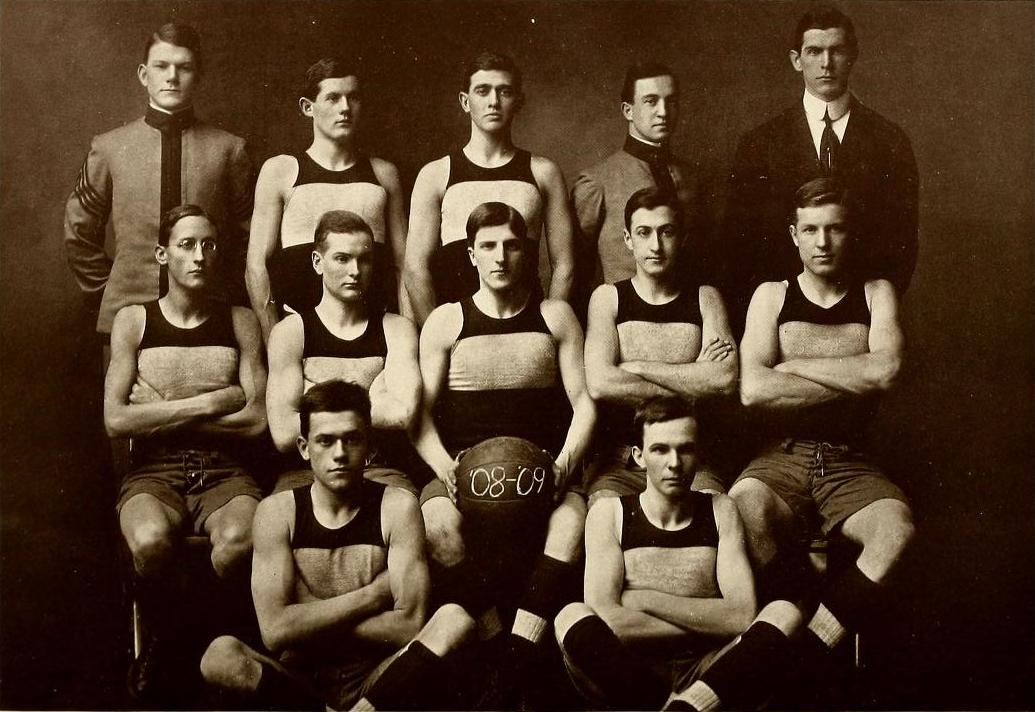
- Conference: Independent
- Record: 3–3
- Head coach: Pete Krebs (1st season)
- Assistant coaches: Alvin Owsley (1 season); C. Brown (1 season)
- Captain: H.J. Porter
- Home arena: Lexington Skating Rink

The 1908–09 VMI Keydets basketball team represented the Virginia Military Institute in their first ever season of basketball. The team was coached by Pete Krebs and went 3–3 the first year. They played their games out of the Lexington Skating Rink.

== Roster ==
The team captain was H.J. Porter.

Number	Name	Position	Class	Hometown
	James McEntee	Forward	Sophomore	Kingston, NY
	Henry J. Porter	Forward	Senior	Birmingham, AL
	Edward Buracker	Guard	Senior	Baltimore, MD
	Harry Venable	Guard	Sophomore	Charleston, WV
	Theo Pattison	Center	Junior	Cambridge, MD
	James Mecredy	Center	Sophomore	Roanoke, VA
	Albert Crockett		Senior	Buffalo, NY
	Homer Kelly	Guard	Sophomore	New Lexington, OH
	Donald MacRae		Freshman	Washington, DC
	Frederick Adams		Senior	Kansas City, MO

== Schedule ==
Date time, TV	Rank^{#}	Opponent^{#}	Result	Record	Site city, state
January 16, 1909*		Staunton Military Academy	W 19–7	1–0	Lexington Skating Rink; Lexington, VA
January 23, 1909*		Virginia	L 14–33	1–1	Lexington Skating Rink; Lexington, VA
January 30, 1909*		Central Y.M.C.A of Baltimore	L 23–25 ^{OT}	1–2	Lexington Skating Rink; Lexington, VA
February 13, 1909*		Randolph Macon	W 47–19	2–2	Lexington Skating Rink; Lexington, VA
February 24, 1909*		at Virginia	L 17–23	2–3	Fayerweather Gymnasium; Charlottesville, VA
February 27, 1909*		Virginia Tech	W 15–9	3–3	Lexington Skating Rink; Lexington, VA
1909*		George Washington			
*Non-conference game. (#) Tournament seedings in parentheses.

== See also ==
- VMI Keydets
- VMI Keydets men's basketball
