= Hope Flying Dutchmen men's basketball =

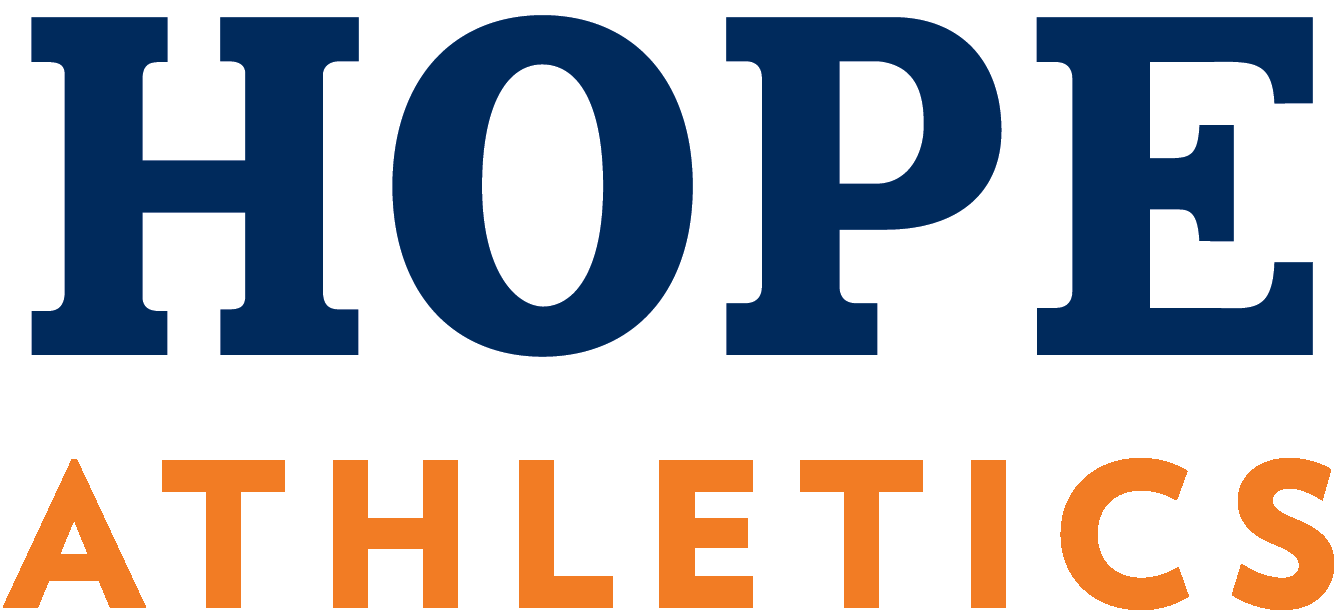
- University: Hope College
- First season: 1901; 125 years ago
- Head coach: Greg Mitchell (8th season)
- Arena: DeVos Fieldhouse (capacity: 3,400)
- Conference: Michigan Intercollegiate Athletic Association
- Nickname: Flying Dutchmen
- Colors: Orange and blue
- Student section: Dew Crew
- All-time record: 1,656–806 (.673)

NCAA Division I tournament runner-up
- 1996, 1998
Other NCAA Division I tournament results
| Final Four | 1996, 1998, 2008 |
| Elite Eight | 1996, 1998, 2007, 2008 |
| Sweet Sixteen | 1982, 1983, 1996, 1998, 2007, 2008, 2017 |
| Appearances | NCAA College Division: 1958, 1959; NCAA Division III: 1982, 1983, 1984, 1985, 1987, 1988, 1989, 1990, 1991, 1992, 1995, 1996, 1997, 1998, 2002, 2003, 2006, 2007, 2008, 2009, 2010, 2011, 2012, 2014, 2016, 2017, 2018, 2022, 2023, 2024 |

Conference tournament champions
- 1995, 1996, 1997, 2002, 2003, 2006, 2008, 2009, 2010, 2011, 2012, 2018, 2022, 2023, 2024, 2026

Conference regular-season champions
- 1934, 1937, 1940, 1943, 1946, 1947, 1952, 1953, 1957, 1958, 1959, 1960, 1962, 1963, 1965, 1967, 1968, 1981, 1982, 1983, 1984, 1985, 1987, 1988, 1991, 1995, 1996, 1997, 1998, 1999, 2003, 2004, 2007, 2008, 2011, 2012, 2014, 2016, 2017, 2018

The Hope Flying Dutchmen men's basketball program represents Hope College in men's basketball at the NCAA Division III level as a member of the Michigan Intercollegiate Athletic Association.
