= Texas Longhorns men's basketball, 1906–1909 =

== 1905–06 season ==
=== Schedule and results ===
Coach: Magnus Mainland; Overall record: 7–1
Date	Opponent	Site	Result	Record
Mar 10	Baylor	Clark Field • Austin, Texas	W 27–17	1–0
?	@ Baylor	? • Waco, Texas	W 32–23	2–0
?	@ Baylor	? • Waco, Texas	W 21–17	3–0
?	@ Baylor	? • Waco, Texas	W 23–18	4–0
?	@ Temple YMCA	? • Temple, Texas	W 30–16	5–0
?	@ Southwest Texas State	? • San Marcos, Texas	W 25–9	6–0
?	@ Southwest Texas State	? • San Marcos, Texas	W 42–8	7–0
?	@ San Antonio High School	? • San Antonio, Texas	L 15–18	7–1

== 1906–07 season ==
=== Schedule and results ===
Coach: Magnus Mainland; Overall record: 5–4^{†}
Date	Opponent	Site	Result	Record
Jan 24	Palestine YMCA	Clark Field • Austin, Texas	W 35–10	1–0
?	Decatur Baptist Academy	Clark Field • Austin, Texas	L 23–24	1–1
?	Baylor	Clark Field • Austin, Texas	W 38–27	2–1
?	@ Baylor	? • Waco, Texas	L 21–23	2–2
?	@ Fort Worth YMCA	? • Fort Worth, Texas	L 23–27	2–3
?	@ Baylor	? • Waco, Texas	L 24–28	2–4
?	@ Cleburne YMCA	? • Cleburne, Texas	W 40–36	3–4
?	San Antonio High School	Clark Field • Austin, Texas	W 36–16	4–4
?	Lakeside Institute	Clark Field • Austin, Texas	W (score unrecorded)	5–4
^{†}4–4 in official UT records (games with unrecorded scores not counted).

== 1907–08 season ==
=== Schedule and results ===
Overall record: n/a
Date	Opponent	Site	Result	Record
No team in 1908

== 1908–09 season ==
=== Schedule and results ===
Coach: W.E. Metzenthin; Overall record: 6–3
Date	Opponent	Site	Result	Record
?	Austin High School	Clark Field • Austin, Texas	W 56–4	1–0
?	Deaf and Dumb Institute	Clark Field • Austin, Texas	W 39–9	2–0
?	@ Allen Academy	? • Bryan, Texas	L 21–42	2–1
?	@ Allen Academy	? • Bryan, Texas	L 21–38	2–2
?	San Antonio High School	Clark Field • Austin, Texas	W 21–19	3–2
?	Baylor	Clark Field • Austin, Texas	L 34–47	3–3
?	@ Baylor	? • Waco, Texas	W 29–21	4–3
?	Deaf and Dumb Institute	Clark Field • Austin, Texas	W 42–3	5–3
?	Austin High School	Clark Field • Austin, Texas	W 21–8	6–3
