= Kenneth L. Wilson =

American athlete

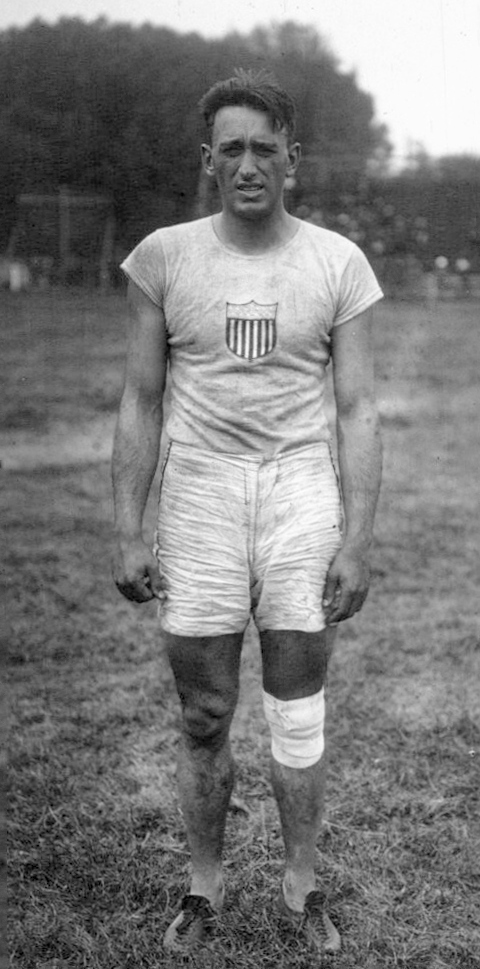
- Wilson in 1920

Personal information
- Born: March 27, 1896 Atwood, Illinois, U.S.
- Died: February 2, 1979 (aged 82) Wilmette, Illinois, U.S.
- Height: 183 cm (6 ft 0 in)

Sport
- Sport: Athletics
- Event(s): Discus throw, shot put, javelin throw
- Club: Chicago AA

Achievements and titles
- Personal best(s): DT – 37.58 m (1920); JT – 52.55 m (1920)

Kenneth Leon "Tug" Wilson (March 27, 1896 – February 2, 1979) was an American track and field athlete and athletics administrator. He competed in the 1920 Summer Olympics, finishing tenth in the discus throw competition. Wilson served as the second commissioner of the Big Ten Conference, from 1945 to 1961, and as the president of the United States Olympic Committee from 1953 to 1965.

== Early life ==
Wilson graduated from Atwood High School in 1914 and began a career in education the following school year by teaching in a country school for two years. He enrolled at the University of Illinois in 1916 and studied agriculture.

== College athletics ==
Wilson was a multi-sport athlete, playing for the Fighting Illini on the 1919 team and named captain for the 1920 team. During the 1920 season, Wilson would play with Helms Athletic Foundation All-American Chuck Carney. He also played end for the football team and was best known for his prowess in track and field. Wilson threw the discus, javelin and shot, making the U.S. Olympic Team in javelin and discus. He competed in the 1920 Summer Olympics in Antwerp, throwing the discus and placing tenth.

== Post-graduate ==
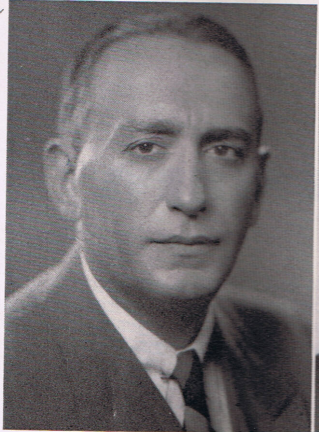
Wilson, c. 1958

Wison graduated from Illinois in 1920 but remained at the university as an assistant to the athletic director, George Huff. He used his experience at Illinois to serve as athletic director and head track coach at Drake from 1922 to 1925. All of these experiences catapulted Wison into the athletic director position at Northwestern University, where he remained until 1945. In 1945, Wison would be named commissioner of the Big Ten Conference, remaining in that position until 1961. Wilson also served as a member of the President's Council on Youth Fitness under President Eisenhower and Kennedy.

== Personal information ==
Wilson married Dorothy Estelle Shade in 1924. His nickname, "Tug" was passed down from his father, Charles Wesley "Tug" Wilson.
