= 1921–22 Michigan Wolverines men's basketball team =

American college basketball season

1921–22 Michigan Wolverines men's basketball
- Conference: Big Ten Conference
- Record: 15–4 (8–4 Big Ten)
- Head coach: E. J. Mather
- Captain: Walter "Bud" Rea
- Home arena: Waterman Gymnasium

1921–22 Big Ten Conference men's basketball standings
| | Conf. | | | | Overall |
| Team | W | | L | PCT | W | | L | PCT |
|---|---|---|---|---|---|---|---|---|
| Purdue | 8 | – | 1 | .889 | 15 | – | 3 | .833 |
| Michigan | 8 | – | 4 | .667 | 15 | – | 4 | .789 |
| Wisconsin | 8 | – | 4 | .667 | 14 | – | 5 | .737 |
| Illinois | 7 | – | 5 | .583 | 14 | – | 5 | .737 |
| Iowa | 5 | – | 6 | .455 | 11 | – | 7 | .611 |
| Chicago | 5 | – | 7 | .417 | 15 | – | 15 | .500 |
| Ohio State | 5 | – | 7 | .417 | 8 | – | 10 | .444 |
| Minnesota | 4 | – | 7 | .364 | 5 | – | 8 | .385 |
| Indiana | 3 | – | 7 | .300 | 10 | – | 10 | .500 |
| Northwestern | 3 | – | 9 | .250 | 7 | – | 11 | .389 |

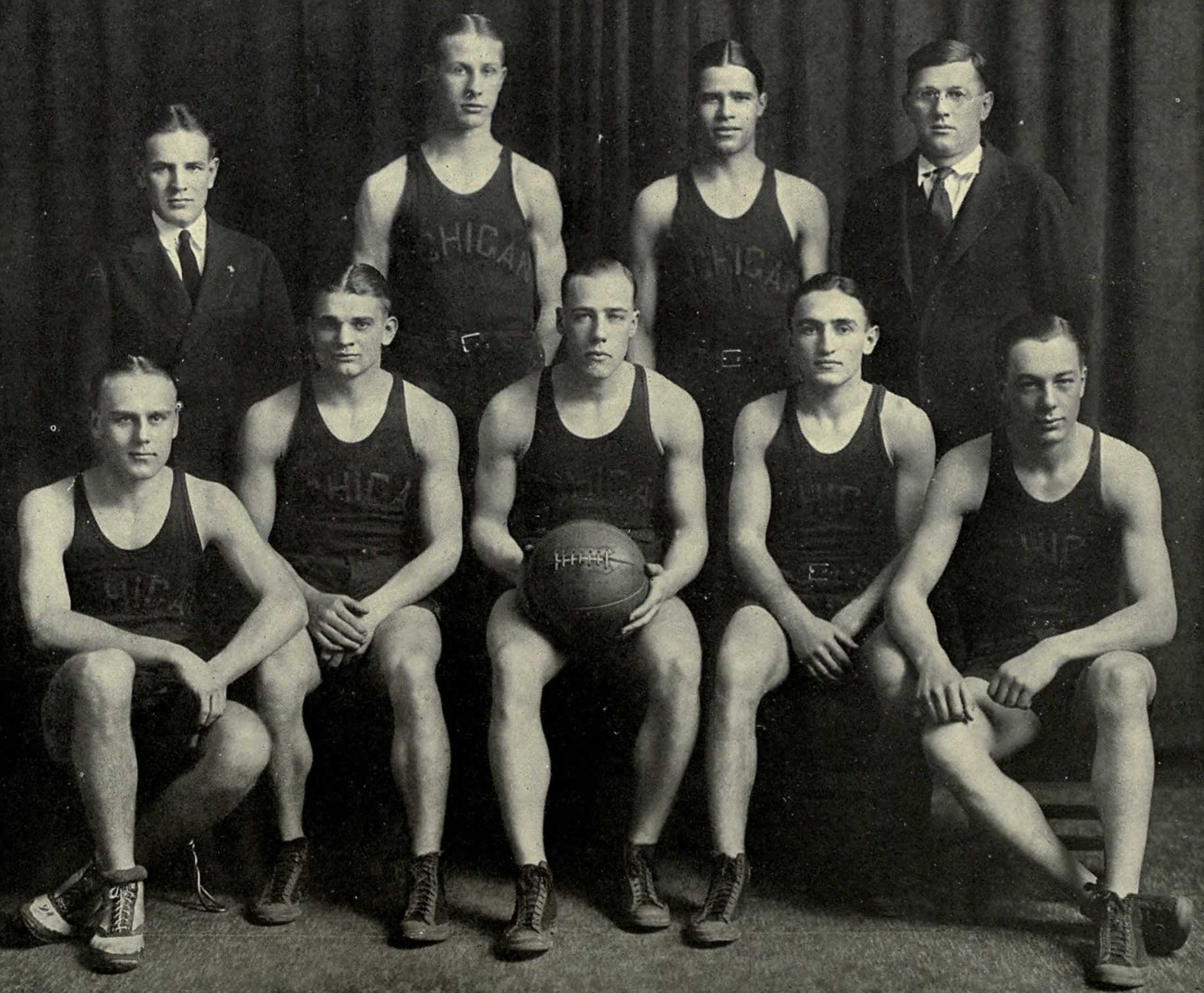
1921-22 Michigan men's basketball team Back (from left): Henry Stricker, Gilbert Ely, Charles Pearman, E. J. Mather Front (from left): Howard Birks, Harry Kipke, Walter Rea, Meyer Paper, George W. Miller

The 1921–22 Michigan Wolverines men's basketball team represented the University of Michigan in intercollegiate basketball during the 1921–22 season. The team compiled a record of 15–4, and 8–4 against Big Ten Conference opponents. Purdue won the Big Ten championship with an 8–1 record in conference play. Michigan finished in second place out of ten teams. E. J. Mather was in his third year as the team's coach, and Walter "Bud" Rea was the team captain.

Michigan's 1920–21 team had won the school's first Big Ten basketball championship, but several key players were lost to graduation or schoolwork. Arthur Karpus and Jack Williams were lost to graduation and "Duke" Dunne chose to focus on his legal studies rather than play basketball. Fifty-five to sixty men turned out for varsity basketball practice in October, and Mather conducted early practices emphasizing "the rudiments of the game, passing, throwing, and blocking." By early December, Mather had cut the squad to 25 players.

Two Michigan players, Gilbert Ely and Bill Miller, ranked among the top five scorers in the Big Ten Conference and were selected as All-Big Ten players. Miller ranked as the third high scorer in the Conference with 139 points in 11 Conference games on 34 field goals and 71 out of 98 free throws. Ely ranked fifth in the Conference with 101 points.

== Schedule ==
- December 9: Michigan 26, Western State Normal 15. Miller was the high scorer with 14 points on three baskets and eight free throws.
- December 15: Michigan 25, Cincinnati 18, at Cincinnati
- December 16: Michigan 29, Case 20, at Cleveland
- December 30: Michigan 36, Carnegie 15, at Waterman Gymnasium.
- December 31: Michigan 48, Carnegie 21, at Waterman Gymnasium. Michigan's 48 points was the second highest total by the Wolverines to that point against a college team. The Wolverines had scored 49 points against Western State Normal in 1919.
- January: Michigan 27, Michigan Agricultural College 26. Michigan won the game in overtime. The Wolverines last overtime game had also been against the Aggies in 1919.
- January 9: Ohio State 25, Michigan 22, at Waterman Gymnasium
- January 13: Michigan 21, Chicago 16, at Waterman Gymnasium
- January 14: Wisconsin 18, Michigan 16, at Madison. Wisconsin won the game in a five-minute overtime period.
- January 16: Illinois 20, Michigan 17, at Urbana.
- February 11: Michigan 38, Ohio State 17, at Columbus. Ely scored 16 points on eight baskets, and Miller added 14 points on four baskets and six free throws.
- February 13: Indiana 15, Michigan 14, at Bloomington. Miller scored all 14 of Michigan's points on four baskets and six free throws.
- February 18: Michigan 18, Wisconsin 17, at Waterman Gymnasium.
- February 20: Michigan 24, Indiana 16, at Waterman Gymnasium. Miller scored 10 points for Michigan on two baskets and six free throws. Ely and Kipke each scored six points on three baskets.
- February 22: Michigan 19, Michigan Agricultural 17. The teams played on Washington's Birthday. Miller scored 15 of Michigan's 19 points on five field goals and five free throws. The win was Michigan's fourth consecutive victory over the Aggies.
- February 25: Michigan 42, Illinois 16, at Waterman Gymnasium. Miller and Ely each scored 20 points. Miller's points came on five field goals and ten free throws. Ely's points came on 10 field goals. The Michigan Alumnus wrote: "Ely was undoubtedly the star of the game. His eye was perfect, and he sank shots from every corner of the floor. Only twice did he fail to get the jump. His floor work was almost perfect."
- February 27: Michigan 22, Iowa 20, at Iowa City. Miller fouled out early in the second period, but still led the scoring for Michigan with 12 points on three field goals and six free throws. Ely added six points on three field goals.
- March 4: Michigan 25, Iowa 19, at Waterman Gymnasium. Miller scored 17 of Michigan's 25 points on three field goals and 11 free throws.
- March 6: Michigan 25, Northwestern 19, at Waterman Gymnasium. Miller scored 15 points on two field goals and 11 free throws. Ely scored eight points on four field goals.

== Players ==
- Howard M. Birks, Chicago, Illinois - guard and varsity letter winner
- Franklin Cappon, Holland, Michigan -
- Gilbert C. Ely, Waldron, Michigan - center and varsity letter winner
- Harry Kipke, Lansing, Michigan - forward and varsity letter winner
- Kenneth B. LeGalley, Lafayette, Michigan - aMa letter winner
- Hugh A. McGregor, Ann Arbor, Michigan - aMa letter winner
- George W. "Bill" Miller, Oxford, Indiana - forward and varsity letter winner
- Meyer Paper, St. Paul, Minnesota - guard and varsity letter winner
- Charles L. Pearman, Verona, New York - guard and varsity letter winner
- William J. Piper, Calumet, Michigan - aMa letter winner
- Walter B. "Bud" Rea, Erie, Pennsylvania - guard, captain and varsity letter winner
- Rex G. Reason, Detroit, Michigan
- Robert Whitlock, Detroit, Michigan - aMa letter winner

== Coaching staff ==
- E. J. Mather - coach
- Henry Stricker - manager
- Philip Bartelme - graduate director
