= Walter Rea =

Walter Rea may refer to:

- Walter Rea, 1st Baron Rea (1873–1948), British merchant banker and Liberal politician
- Walter T. Rea (1922–2014), former Seventh-day Adventist pastor
- Walter B. Rea (1898–1970), American university administrator and basketball player
