= 1919–20 Chicago Maroons men's basketball team =

American college basketball season

1919–20 Chicago Maroons men's basketball
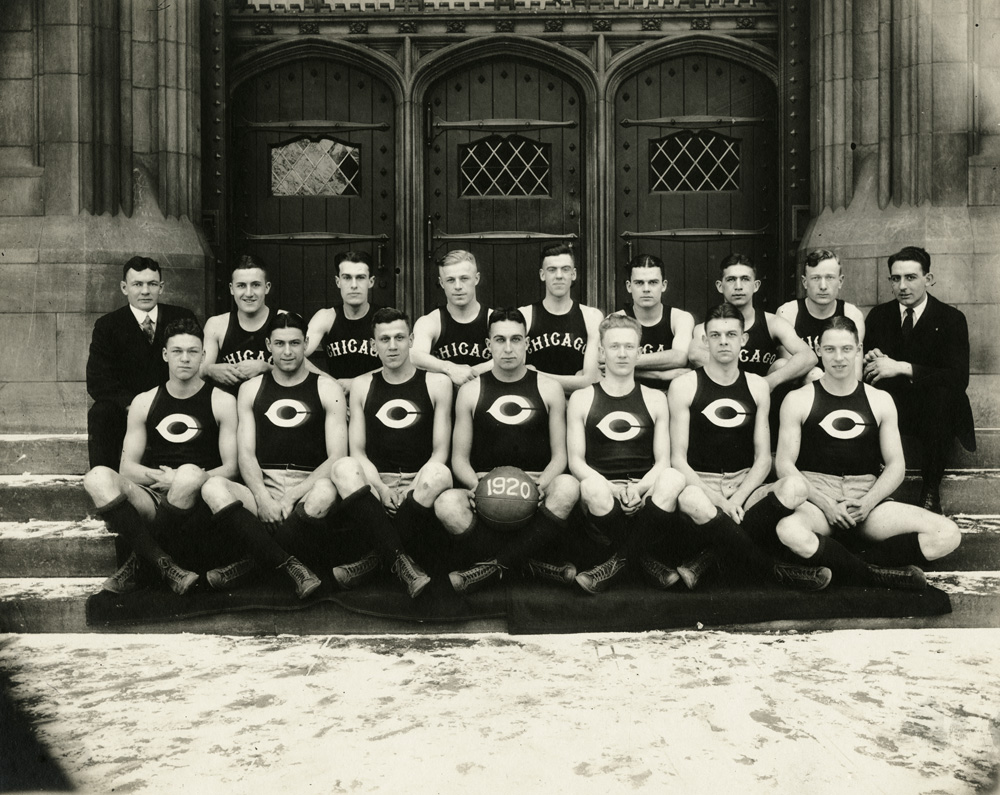

Big Ten champion
- Conference: Big Ten Conference
- Record: 14–4 (10–2 Big Ten)
- Head coach: Harlan Page (9th season)
- Assistant coaches: Samuel A. Rothermel; Twohig
- Captain: Paul Hinkle
- Home arena: Bartlett Gymnasium

1919–20 Big Ten Conference men's basketball standings
	Conf.				Overall
Team	W		L	PCT	W		L	PCT
Chicago	10	–	2	.833	14	–	4	.778
Purdue	8	–	2	.800	16	–	4	.800
Illinois	8	–	4	.667	9	–	4	.692
Indiana	6	–	4	.600	13	–	8	.619
Wisconsin	7	–	5	.583	15	–	5	.750
Iowa	6	–	6	.500	9	–	10	.474
Ohio State	3	–	9	.250	17	–	10	.630
Minnesota	3	–	9	.250	7	–	9	.438
Michigan	3	–	9	.250	10	–	13	.435
Northwestern	2	–	6	.250	3	–	7	.300

The 1919–20 Chicago Maroons men's basketball team represented the University of Chicago.

== Regular season ==
The 1919–20 Chicago Maroons men's basketball season was the final of nine seasons for head coach Pat Page. This group was first Big Ten champion in ten years for the Maroons. The campaign began with a three-game home winning streak, a loss to Iowa, followed by a seven-game winning streak. The team would play 12 conference games with only two defeats. The Maroons were led by captain Paul Hinkle, who would go on to coach Butler University in basketball as well as football for nearly 50 years. Complementing Hinkle at guard, the Maroons also started Herbert "Fritz" Crisler who also would create a legacy for himself as a coach and athletic director. Additionally, the team rounded out the starting five with combinations of Clarence Vollmer, Robert Birkhoff and Ted Curtiss at forward, Harry Williams and Robert Halladay at center.

At seasons end, Paul "Tony" Hinkle, was named an All-American, while also being named 1st-team all-conference guard. For Hinkle, it was his second consecutive All-American honor and it was the third consecutive all-conference award. Crisler and Vollmer would be named to the all-conference honorable mention team for the 1920 season with Crisler being named defensive player of the year.

=== National Collegiate Championship Series ===
At the end of the regular season, Chicago sat at the top of the Big Ten and was considered the champion of the Western Intercollegiate Conference. Simultaneously the Penn Quakers had won the Eastern Intercollegiate Conference. To decide the 1920 national collegiate basketball championship a series of three games was arranged between the two champions. On March 22, 1920, the first game was played before a crowd of 3,600 fans in Bartlett Gymnasium. The champions of the east would fall behind the Maroons at the half by a score of 17–6; however, the final score of the game would be much tighter at 28–24. In the game both Vollmer and Birkhoff each scored 12 points, while Curtiss and Halladay each added a basket.

The second game was played at the University of Pennsylvania's gymnasium which was also the YMCA. The Maroons were not equipped to play in a facility such as this and struggled to a 10–10 halftime score. But, in the end, the champions of the west would succumb to the Quakers and be defeated by a final score of 29–18. In the game both Hinkle and Halladay would foul out as the Maroons would be the recipients of 20 fouls, allowing the Quakers to have multiple free throw opportunities.

The final game was played on the campus of Princeton University within the University Gymnasium. Back on a familiar setting and playing on a semi-neutral court, the Maroons played a very close game. In the end, the Quakers would come out on top by a score of 23–21 and win the Intercollegiate National Championship.

== Roster ==
Player	Position	Class	Hometown
Paul Daniel Hinkle captain	Guard	Senior	Logansport, IN
Herbert "Fritz" Orin Crisler	Guard	Junior	Earlville, Illinois
Clarence Vollmer	Forward	Sophomore	Alma, WI
Robert Droppers Birkhoff	Forward	Junior	Chicago, IL
Edwin "Ted" Charles Curtiss	Forward	Senior	Downers Grove, IL
Harry George Williams	Center	Junior	Chicago, IL
Robert Thayer Halladay	Center	Sophomore	Chicago, IL
Paul C. Hitchcock	Substitute	Junior	Beltrami, Minnesota
Edgar Henry Palmer	Substitute	Sophomore
Charles Euclid McGuire	Substitute	Sophomore	Sweetwater, TN
Frank John Madden	Substitute	Senior	Chicago, IL
Jerome Price Neff	Substitute	Sophomore
Perry Segal	Substitute	Junior

- Head coach: Harlan Page (9th year at Chicago)

== Schedule ==
Date time, TV	Opponent	Result	Record	Site (attendance) city, state
1/10/1920 no, no	vs Iowa	W 37–18	1-0 (1-0)	Bartlett Gymnasium (–); Chicago, IL
1/17/1920 no, no	vs Wisconsin	W 37–19	2-0 (2-0)	Bartlett Gymnasium (–); Chicago, IL
1/24/1920 no, no	vs Michigan	W 42–22	3-0 (3-0)	Bartlett Gymnasium (–); Chicago, IL
1/27/1920 no, no	@ Iowa	L 19–22	3-1 (3-1)	Iowa Armory (–); Iowa City, IA
1/30/1920 no, no	vs Ohio State	W 46–22	4-1 (4-1)	Bartlett Gymnasium (–); Chicago, IL
2/7/1920 no, no	@ Minnesota	W 35–10	5-1 (5-1)	University of Minnesota Armory (-); Minneapolis, MN
2/11/1920 no, no	@ Ohio State	W 19–13	6-1 (6-1)	Ohio Expo Center Coliseum (-); Columbus, OH
2/14/1920 no, no	@ Illinois	W 23–21	7-1 (7-1)	Kenney Gym (4,420); Urbana, IL
2/21/1920 no, no	vs Michigan	W 31–19	8-1 (8-1)	Waterman Gymnasium (–); Ann Arbor, MI
2/28/1920 no, no	vs Illinois	W 27–20	9-1 (9-1)	Bartlett Gymnasium (–); Chicago, IL
3/6/1920 no, no	vs Minnesota	W 58–16	10-1 (10-1)	Bartlett Gymnasium (–); Chicago, IL
3/12/1920 no, no	@ Wisconsin	L 17–26	10-2 (10-2)	University of Wisconsin Armory and Gymnasium (-); Madison, WI
3/22/1920* no, no	vs Penn; National Collegiate Championship game 1	W 28–24	11-2 (10-2)	Bartlett Gymnasium (3,600); Chicago, IL
3/25/1920* no, no	@ Penn; National Collegiate Championship game 2	L 18–29	11-3 (10-2)	Penn College YMCA (-); Philadelphia, PA
3/27/1920* no, no	vs Penn; National Collegiate Championship game 3	L 21–23	11-4 (10-2)	University Gymnasium (-); Princeton, NJ
*Non-conference game. ^{#}Rankings from AP Poll. (#) Tournament seedings in parentheses. All times are in Central Time.

Bold Italic connotes conference game

== Awards and honors ==
- Paul Hinkle selected as an All-American for the 1919–20 season.
- Fritz Crisler achieved the Big Ten Medal of Honor following the 1921-22 season
