= 1921–22 Indiana Hoosiers men's basketball team =

American college basketball season

1921–22 Indiana Hoosiers men's basketball
- Conference: Big Ten Conference
- Record: 10–10 (3–7 Big Ten)
- Head coach: George Levis (2nd season)
- Captain: Eugene Thomas
- Home arena: Men's Gymnasium

1921–22 Big Ten Conference men's basketball standings
	Conf.				Overall
Team	W		L	PCT	W		L	PCT
Purdue	8	–	1	.889	15	–	3	.833
Michigan	8	–	4	.667	15	–	4	.789
Wisconsin	8	–	4	.667	14	–	5	.737
Illinois	7	–	5	.583	14	–	5	.737
Iowa	5	–	6	.455	11	–	7	.611
Chicago	5	–	7	.417	15	–	15	.500
Ohio State	5	–	7	.417	8	–	10	.444
Minnesota	4	–	7	.364	5	–	8	.385
Indiana	3	–	7	.300	10	–	10	.500
Northwestern	3	–	9	.250	7	–	11	.389

The 1921–22 Indiana Hoosiers men's basketball team represented Indiana University. Their head coach was George Levis, who was in his 2nd and final year. The team played its home games at the Men's Gymnasium in Bloomington, Indiana, and was a member of the Big Ten Conference.

The Hoosiers finished the regular season with an overall record of 10–10 and a conference record of 3–7, finishing 9th in the Big Ten Conference.

== Roster ==
Name	Position	Year	Hometown
Relle Aldridge	F	Jr.	Lyons, Indiana
Wilfred Bahr	F	So.	Evansville, Indiana
Lawrence Busby	C	Sr.	Lapel, Indiana
Joy Buckner	G	Sr.	Bluffton, Indiana
George Coffey	C	So.	Bloomington, Indiana
William Crowe	G	So.	Bedford, Indiana
Elder Eberhardt	G	So.	Evansville, Indiana
Russell Hauss	G	Jr.	Sellersburg, Indiana
Samuel Houston	F	So.	Salem, Indiana
Wyatt May	G	So.	Bloomington, Indiana
Harold Sanford	F	So.	Lebanon, Indiana
Joseph Sloate	F	So.	Akron, Ohio
Wayne Swango	F	So.	Oolitic, Indiana
Eugene Thomas	G	Jr.	Fortville, Indiana

== Schedule/results ==
Date time, TV	Rank^{#}	Opponent^{#}	Result	Record	Site city, state
Regular season
12/2/1921*		Manchester	W 25–15	1–0	Men's Gymnasium; Bloomington, Indiana
12/7/1921*		Hanover	W 18–11	2–0	Men's Gymnasium; Bloomington, Indiana
12/10/1921*		Indiana Dental College	L 24–31	2–1	Men's Gymnasium; Bloomington, Indiana
12/15/1921*		at Habichs	L 29–33	2–2	
12/17/1921*		Rose Poly	W 31–19	3–2	Men's Gymnasium; Bloomington, Indiana
12/19/1921*		at DePauw	L 23–41	3–3	Green Castle, Indiana
1/6/1922*		Huntington College	W 25–14	4–3	Men's Gymnasium; Bloomington, Indiana
1/7/1922*		Camp Benning	W 46–20	5–3	Men's Gymnasium; Bloomington, Indiana
1/14/1922		Northwestern	W 21–18	6–3 (1–0)	Men's Gymnasium; Bloomington, Indiana
1/20/1922		at Ohio State	L 17–23	6–4 (1–1)	Ohio Expo Center Coliseum; Columbus, Ohio
1/23/1922		Minnesota	L 16–19	6–5 (1–2)	Men's Gymnasium; Bloomington, Indiana
1/26/1922*		DePauw	W 36–32	7–5 (1–2)	Men's Gymnasium; Bloomington, Indiana
2/2/1922*		at Marquette	W 20–17	8–5 (1–2)	Milwaukee
2/4/1922		at Minnesota	W 23–19	9–5 (2–2)	UM Armory; Minneapolis
2/11/1922		Purdue; Rivalry	L 19–24	9–6 (2–3)	Men's Gymnasium; Bloomington, Indiana
2/13/1922		Michigan	W 15–14	10–6 (3–3)	Men's Gymnasium; Bloomington, Indiana
2/18/1922		at Northwestern	L 16–25	10–7 (3–4)	Old Patten Gymnasium; Evanston, Illinois
2/20/1922		at Michigan	L 16–24	10–8 (3–5)	Waterman Gymnasium; Ann Arbor, Michigan
2/25/1922		at Purdue; Rivalry	L 9–20	10–9 (3–6)	Memorial Gymnasium; West Lafayette, Indiana
2/27/1922		Ohio State	L 18–20	10–10 (3–7)	Men's Gymnasium; Bloomington, Indiana
*Non-conference game. ^{#}Rankings from AP Poll. (#) Tournament seedings in parentheses.
