= 1920–21 Indiana Hoosiers men's basketball team =

American college basketball season

1920–21 Indiana Hoosiers men's basketball
- Conference: Big Ten Conference
- Record: 15–6 (6–5 Big Ten)
- Head coach: George Levis (1st season)
- Captain: Everett Dean
- Home arena: Men's Gymnasium

1920–21 Big Ten Conference men's basketball standings
	Conf.				Overall
Team	W		L	PCT	W		L	PCT
Michigan	8	–	4	.667	18	–	4	.818
Wisconsin	8	–	4	.667	13	–	4	.765
Purdue	8	–	4	.667	13	–	7	.650
Minnesota	7	–	5	.583	10	–	5	.667
Illinois	7	–	5	.583	11	–	7	.611
Indiana	6	–	5	.545	15	–	6	.714
Iowa	6	–	5	.545	9	–	9	.500
Chicago	6	–	6	.500	14	–	6	.700
Ohio State	2	–	10	.167	4	–	13	.235
Northwestern	1	–	11	.083	2	–	12	.143

The 1920–21 Indiana Hoosiers men's basketball team represented Indiana University. Their head coach was George Levis, who was in his first year. The team played its home games at the Men's Gymnasium in Bloomington, Indiana, and was a member of the Big Ten Conference.

The Hoosiers finished the regular season with an overall record of 15–6 and a conference record of 6–5, finishing 6th in the Big Ten Conference.

== Roster ==
Name	Position	Year	Hometown
Relle Aldridge	F	So.	Lyons, Indiana
Lawrence Busby	C	Jr.	Lapel, Indiana
Joy Buckner	G	Jr.	Bluffton, Indiana
Frank Cox	F	So.	Indianapolis, Indiana
Everett Dean	C	Sr.	Salem, Indiana
Ed DeHority	F	N/A	Elwood, Indiana
William Dobbins	G	Sr.	Bloomington, Indiana
Harry Donovan	C	Sr.	South Bend, Indiana
Russell Hauss	G	Jr.	Sellersburg, Indiana
Glen Johnson	F	Jr.	Huntington, Indiana
Robert Marxson	F	So.	Bloomington, Indiana
Kermit Maynard	G	Jr.	Columbus, Indiana
Herm Schuler	F	Sr.	Elkhart, Indiana
Eugene Thomas	G	So.	Fortville, Indiana
Edward Von Tress	G	Sr.	Vincennes, Indiana

== Schedule/results ==
Date time, TV	Rank^{#}	Opponent^{#}	Result	Record	Site city, state
Regular season
12/4/1920*		Armour Institute	W 46–16	1–0	Men's Gymnasium; Bloomington, IN
12/10/1920*		Indiana Dental College	W 37–13	2–0	Men's Gymnasium; Bloomington, IN
12/15/1920*		Evansville YMCA	W 44–15	3–0	Men's Gymnasium; Bloomington, IN
12/18/1920*		Manchester	W 44–12	4–0	Men's Gymnasium; Bloomington, IN
12/22/1920*		Indiana State	W 44–11	5–0	Men's Gymnasium; Bloomington, IN
12/29/1920*		at Kokomo American Legion	W 34–18	6–0	Kokomo, IN
1/3/1921*		Merchants Heat and Light	L 21–34	6–1	Men's Gymnasium; Bloomington, IN
1/8/1921		at Ohio State	W 29–24	7–1 (1–0)	Ohio Expo Center Coliseum; Columbus, OH
1/10/1921		at Michigan	W 30–21	8–1 (2–0)	Waterman Gymnasium; Ann Arbor, MI
1/17/1921		Northwestern	W 31–10	9–1 (3–0)	Men's Gymnasium; Bloomington, IN
1/21/1921		at Minnesota	W 25–23	10–1 (4–0)	UM Armory; Minneapolis, MN
1/23/1921*		at Carleton	W 24–23	11–1 (4–0)	Northfield, MN
1/28/1921		at Purdue; Rivalry	L 18–27	11–2 (4–1)	Memorial Gymnasium; West Lafayette, IN
2/4/1921*		Louisville	W 34–17	12–2 (4–1)	Men's Gymnasium; Bloomington, IN
2/9/1921*		DePauw	W 24–18	13–2 (4–1)	Men's Gymnasium; Bloomington, IN
2/14/1921		Ohio State	W 33–11	14–2 (5–1)	Men's Gymnasium; Bloomington, IN
2/19/1921		at Northwestern	W 23–21	15–2 (6–1)	Old Patten Gymnasium; Evanston, IL
2/21/1921		at Iowa	L 15–22	15–3 (6–2)	Iowa Armory; Iowa City, IA
2/26/1921		Iowa	L 17–26	15–4 (6–3)	Men's Gymnasium; Bloomington, IN
3/3/1921		Purdue; Rivalry	L 20–28	15–5 (6–4)	Men's Gymnasium; Bloomington, IN
3/7/1921		Minnesota	L 25–29	15–6 (6–5)	Men's Gymnasium; Bloomington, IN
*Non-conference game. ^{#}Rankings from AP Poll. (#) Tournament seedings in parentheses.
