= 1921–22 Illinois Fighting Illini men's basketball team =

American college basketball season

1921–22 Illinois Fighting Illini men's basketball
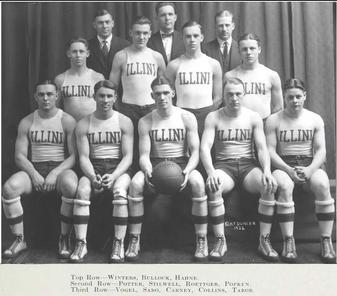
- Conference: Big Ten Conference
- Record: 14–5 (7–5 Big Ten)
- Head coach: Frank Winters (2nd season)
- Captain: Charles Carney
- Home arena: Kenney Gym

1921–22 Big Ten Conference men's basketball standings
	Conf.				Overall
Team	W		L	PCT	W		L	PCT
Purdue	8	–	1	.889	15	–	3	.833
Michigan	8	–	4	.667	15	–	4	.789
Wisconsin	8	–	4	.667	14	–	5	.737
Illinois	7	–	5	.583	14	–	5	.737
Iowa	5	–	6	.455	11	–	7	.611
Chicago	5	–	7	.417	15	–	15	.500
Ohio State	5	–	7	.417	8	–	10	.444
Minnesota	4	–	7	.364	5	–	8	.385
Indiana	3	–	7	.300	10	–	10	.500
Northwestern	3	–	9	.250	7	–	11	.389

The 1921–22 Illinois Fighting Illini men's basketball team represented the University of Illinois.

== Regular season ==
The 1921–22 season was the second and final one for head coach Frank Winters at the University of Illinois. For Winters and the Illinois Fighting Illini men's basketball team, the season was highlighted by the play of All-American Chuck Carney. Carney was selected as an All-American and named the Helms Foundation College Basketball Player of the Year at the completion of the season. The Illini's only losses were at the hands of Big Ten Conference opponents, ultimately placing them in a tie for fourth place. The overall record for this team was 14 wins and 5 losses. The Big Ten record for the season was 7 wins 5 losses. The starting lineup included Carney, R.H. Popken and G.E. Potter at forward, W.H. Roettger at center, and Laurie Walquist and John Sabo as guards.

=== Roster ===
1921–22 Illinois Fighting Illini men's basketball team
Players
Coaches

Pos.	#	Name	Height	Weight	Year	Hometown
F	1	Chuck Carney (C)	—	—	Sr	Evanston, Illinois
G	2	Walter Samuel Collins	—	—	Sr	Rockford, Illinois
G	3	John Sabo	—	—	Sr	Toledo, Ohio
C	4	Wally Roettger	—	—	So	St. Louis, Missouri
C	5	Leland "Slim" Stillwell	—	—	So	Olney, Illinois
G	6	Otto Vogel	—	—	Jr	Iowa City, Iowa
F	7	Roland H. Popken	—	—	So	Oak Park, Illinois
F	8	Charles Franklin Gipson	—	—	So	Amboy, Illinois
F	9	Glenn E. Potter	—	—	So	Orange, California
G	10	Hubert Tabor	—	—	Sr	Sullivan, Illinois
F	11	Charles Milton White	—	—	Jr	Chicago, Illinois
F	12	Harry Clay Neville	—	—	Jr	Pinckneyville, Illinois
G	13	John Wilbur Hansen	—	—	Jr	Brookston, Indiana
F	14	Cecil Reynolds Danielson	—	—	Jr	Rockford, Illinois
G	15	L. Elden	—	—	So	Buffalo, New York
G	16	Lawrence Walquist	—	—	Sr	Chicago, Illinois

Head coach

- Frank Winters (Springfield (MA)) (2nd year)

Assistant coach(es)

Legend

- (C) Team captain
- (S) Suspended
- (I) Ineligible
- (W) Walk-on
- Injured
- Current redshirt

Roster

== Schedule ==
Date time, TV	Rank^{#}	Opponent^{#}	Result	Record	Site (attendance) city, state
Non-Conference regular season
12/16/1921*		Illinois Wesleyan	W 35–19	1-0	Kenney Gym (2,835); Urbana, IL
12/17/1921*		Knox College	W 32–24	2-0	Kenney Gym (2,508); Urbana, IL
12/30/1921*		Millikin University	W 33–20	3-0	Kenney Gym (800); Urbana, IL
1/2/1922*		Notre Dame	W 49–38	4-0	Kenney Gym (1,000); Urbana, IL
1/3/1922*		Notre Dame	W 40–27	5-0	Kenney Gym (3,118); Urbana, IL
1/7/1922*		Butler	W 26–20	6-0	Kenney Gym (4,107); Urbana, IL
Big Ten regular season
1/14/1922		at Ohio State	W 48–36	7-0 (1-0)	Ohio Expo Center Coliseum (-); Columbus, OH
1/16/1922		Michigan	W 20–17	8-0 (2-0)	Kenney Gym (4,285); Urbana, IL
1/19/1922*		at Millikin University	W 34–33	9-0	Millikin Gymnasium (-); Decatur, IL
2/4/1922		at University of Chicago	L 16–22	9-1 (2-1)	Bartlett Gymnasium (-); Chicago, IL
2/7/1922		Purdue	W 29–28	10-1 (3-1)	Kenney Gym (4,294); Urbana, IL
2/10/1922		at Wisconsin	L 23–25	10-2 (3-2)	University of Wisconsin Armory and Gymnasium (-); Madison, WI
2/11/1922		at Minnesota	W 29–28	11-2 (4-2)	University of Minnesota Armory (-); Minneapolis, MN
2/18/1922		Minnesota	W 28–18	12-2 (5-2)	Kenney Gym (4,289); Urbana, IL
2/20/1922		Ohio State	W 41–22	13-2 (6-2)	Kenney Gym (4,289); Urbana, IL
2/25/1922		at Michigan	L 16–42	13-3 (6-3)	Waterman Gymnasium (-); Ann Arbor, MI
2/27/1922		Wisconsin	W 37–35	14-3 (7-3)	Kenney Gym (4,293); Urbana, IL
3/3/1922		University of Chicago	L 25–26	14-4 (7-4)	Kenney Gym (4,294); Urbana, IL
3/7/1922		at Purdue	L 31–39	14-5 (7-5)	Memorial Gymnasium (-); West Lafayette, IN
*Non-conference game. ^{#}Rankings from AP Poll. (#) Tournament seedings in parentheses. All times are in Central Time.

== Player stats ==
Player	Games played	Field goals	Free throws	Points
Charles Carney	19	79	100	258
Leland Stillwell	19	54	0	108
Roland Popken	19	20	11	51
Glenn Potter	13	20	0	40
John Sabo	19	19	0	38
Laurie Walquist	8	16	0	32
Walter Roettger	9	14	0	28
Hubert Tabor	12	14	0	28
Walter Collins	18	5	0	10

== Awards and honors ==
- Chuck Carney was elected to the "Illini Men's Basketball All-Century Team" in 2004. Carney was also selected as the Helms Foundation College Basketball Player of the Year for his play during the 1921–22 season.
- Otto Vogel received the Big Ten Medal of Honor for his proficiency in athletics and scholastic work following the 1922 season.
