= 1919–20 Michigan Wolverines men's basketball team =

American college basketball season

1919–20 Michigan Wolverines men's basketball
- Conference: Big Ten Conference
- Record: 10–13 (3–9 Big Ten)
- Head coach: E. J. Mather
- Captain: Ralph O. Rychener
- Home arena: Waterman Gymnasium

1919–20 Big Ten Conference men's basketball standings
	Conf.				Overall
Team	W		L	PCT	W		L	PCT
Chicago	10	–	2	.833	14	–	4	.778
Purdue	8	–	2	.800	16	–	4	.800
Illinois	8	–	4	.667	9	–	4	.692
Indiana	6	–	4	.600	13	–	8	.619
Wisconsin	7	–	5	.583	15	–	5	.750
Iowa	6	–	6	.500	9	–	10	.474
Ohio State	3	–	9	.250	17	–	10	.630
Minnesota	3	–	9	.250	7	–	9	.438
Michigan	3	–	9	.250	10	–	13	.435
Northwestern	2	–	6	.250	3	–	7	.300

The 1919–20 Michigan Wolverines men's basketball team represented the University of Michigan in intercollegiate basketball during the 1919–20 season. The team compiled a record of 10–13, and 3–9 against Big Ten Conference opponents. The University of Chicago won the Big Ten championship with a 10–2 record in conference play. Michigan finished in seventh place out of ten teams. E. J. Mather was in his first year as the team's coach, and Ralph O. Rychener was the team captain.

The 1920 Michiganensian wrote that Jack Williams was "the outstanding individual player of the 1920 season" and noted that he led a late season rally. Arthur Karpus was the team's leading scorer with 75 points in eight conference games on 22 field goals and 31 free throws. R. Jerome Dunne was the second leading scorer with 54 points in 12 games on 27 field goals and zero free throws. Walter B. Rea scored 47 points in 12 conference games on 18 field goals and 11 free throws. Benjamin Weiss ranked fourth in scoring with 18 points on seven field goals and four free throws in seven conference games.

In November 1919, The Michigan Alumnus announced the hiring of E. J. Mather as the new head basketball coach and assistant coach in football and baseball. Mather had been a three-sport athlete at Lake Forest College in Illinois and thereafter became the athletic director at Kalamazoo College. His basketball teams won the M.I.A.A. championship in all five seasons that Mather was there. With the hiring of Mather, Elmer Mitchell became Michigan's director of intramural athletics and athletic editor of The Michigan Alumnus. Mitchell published an article titled, "The Game of Basketball" in the January 1920 issue of the Alumnus. Mitchell wrote that basketball was Michigan's newest varsity sport and ranked fourth in popularity behind football, baseball, and track. He noted that basketball at Michigan was "fighting an uphill game to strengthen its prestige" and had features that were "practically unknown to the Michigan following." Mather began pre-season workouts in November with a squad of approximately 35 candidates.

== Schedule ==
Date	Opponent	Score	Result	Location
December 13, 1919	Kalamazoo College	22–12	Win	Waterman Gymnasium, Ann Arbor, MI
December 18, 1919	St. Mary's	34–22	Win	Waterman Gymnasium, Ann Arbor, MI
December 19, 1919	Western State Normal	27–14	Loss	Waterman Gymnasium, Ann Arbor, MI
December 31, 1919	Oakland Motor Co.	20–9	Win	Pontiac, MI
January 1, 1920	Champion Ignition	34–15	Win	Flint, MI
January 3, 1920	Detroit Rayls	19–14	Loss	Detroit, MI
January 4, 1920	Detroit Athletic Club	36–17	Win	Detroit, MI
January 11, 1920	Hillsdale College	22–18	Win	Waterman Gymnasium, Ann Arbor, MI
January 16, 1920	Western Reserve	33–13	Win	Waterman Gymnasium, Ann Arbor, MI
January 17, 1920	Indiana	22–9	Loss	Waterman Gymnasium, Ann Arbor, MI
January 24, 1920	Chicago	40–33	Loss	Bartlett Gymnasium, Chicago, IL
January 26, 1920	Illinois	41–14	Loss	Kenney Gym, Urbana, IL
January 30, 1920	Michigan Agricultural College	23–13	Loss	Waterman Gymnasium, Ann Arbor, MI
January 31, 1920	Ohio State	30–18	Loss	Waterman Gymnasium, Ann Arbor, MI
February 14, 1920	Wisconsin	40–13	Loss	University of Wisconsin Armory and Gymnasium, Madison, WI
February 16, 1920	Minnesota	21–20	Win	University of Minnesota Armory, Minneapolis, MN
February 21, 1920	Chicago	31–19	Loss	Waterman Gymnasium, Ann Arbor, MI
February 28, 1920	Michigan Agricultural College	34–27	Loss	Michigan State University Armory, East Lansing, MI
March 1, 1920	Illinois	28–21	Loss	Waterman Gymnasium, Ann Arbor, MI
March 6, 1920	Wisconsin	23–19	Win	Waterman Gymnasium, Ann Arbor, MI
March 8, 1920	Minnesota	30–16	Win	Waterman Gymnasium, Ann Arbor, MI
March 13, 1920	Ohio State	34–20	Loss	Ohio Expo Center Coliseum, Columbus, OH.
March 16, 1920	Indiana	19–18	Loss	Men's Gymnasium, Bloomington, IN

== Players ==
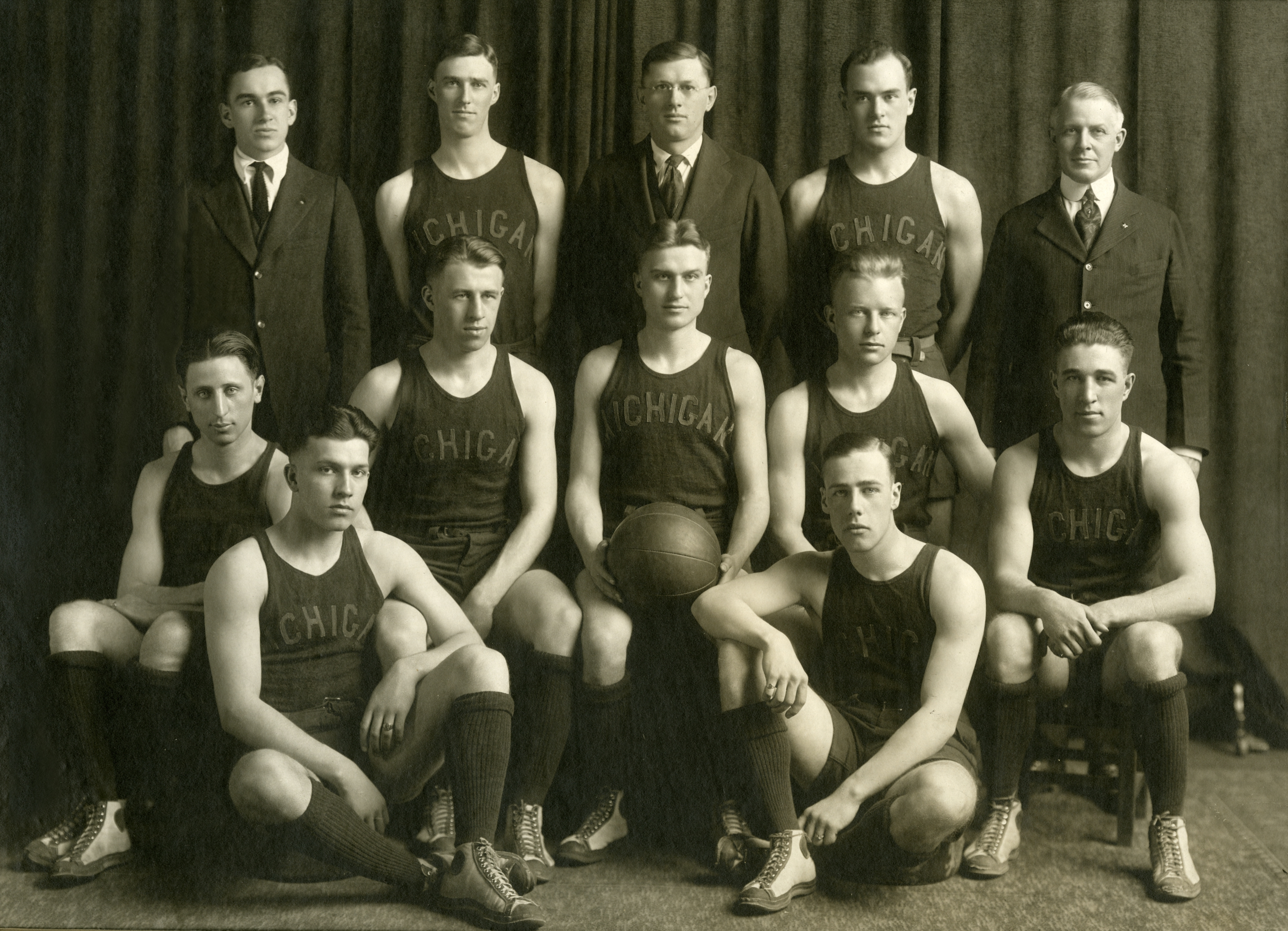
1920 Michigan men's basketball team Back row (left to right): Clayton Shoemaker (manager), Jack Williams, E. J. Mather (coach), R. Jerome Dunne, and Philip Barthelme (athletic director) Middle row (left right): Benjamin Weiss, William Henderson, Ralph O. Rychener (captain), Wilford Wilson, Arthur Karpus Front row (seated on floor): Robert Peare, Walter B. Rea

- Borinstein - aMa letter winner
- Hugh Cook, Grand Rapids, Michigan - forward and aMa letter winner
- R. Jerome Dunne, Chicago, Illinois - center and varsity letter winner
- Milton B. Gevirtz (sometimes Gervirtz), Whiting, Indiana - forward and aMa letter winner
- William P. Henderson, Detroit, Michigan - forward and varsity letter winner
- Arthur Karpus, Grayling, Michigan - forward and varsity letter winner
- Mason
- Charles C. Merkel, Ann Arbor, Michigan - guard
- Robert S. Peare, Rockville, Indiana - guard and varsity letter winner
- Charles L. Pearman, Verona, New York - forward and aMa letter winner
- Walter B. Rea - forward and varsity letter winner
- Edward E. Ruzicka, Chicago, Illinois - scored two points on one field goal in a conference game.
- Ralph O. Rychener, Archbold, Ohio - guard and varsity letter winner
- Benjamin Weiss, Newark, New Jersey - guard and varsity letter winner
- Jack G. Williams - guard and varsity letter winner
- Wilford C. Wilson - guard and varsity letter winner

== Scoring statistics ==
Player	Games	Field goals	Free throws	Points	Points per game
Walter B. Rea	16	40	13	93	5.8
R. Jerome Dunne	17	38	0	76	4.5
William Henderson	11	25	23	73	6.6
Arthur Karpus	5	14	23	51	10.2
Benjamin Weiss	13	8	4	20	1.5
Ralph O. Rychener	11	7	3	17	1.5
Milton Gevirtz	6	5	3	13	2.2
Peare, Robert	12	4	0	8	0.7
Wilford Wilson	15	2	0	4	0.3
Mason	4	1	0	2	0.5
Jack Williams	6	0	0	0	0.0
Hugh Cook	6	0	0	0	0.0
Charles Pearman	4	0	0	0	0.0
Total	17	144	69	357	21.0

- The scoring statistics do not include games against Oakland Motor (12/31/1919), Champion Ignition (1/1/1920), Illinois (1/26/1920), Michigan Agricultural (2/28/1920), Ohio State (3/13/1920), and Indiana (3/16/1920).

== Coaching staff ==
- E. J. Mather - coach
- Clayton S. Shoemaker - manager
- Philip Bartelme - graduate director
