= 1919–20 Indiana Hoosiers men's basketball team =

American college basketball season

1919–20 Indiana Hoosiers men's basketball
- Conference: Big Ten Conference
- Record: 13–8 (6–4 Big Ten)
- Head coach: Ewald O. Stiehm (1st season)
- Captain: Arlo Byrum
- Home arena: Men's Gymnasium

1919–20 Big Ten Conference men's basketball standings
	Conf.				Overall
Team	W		L	PCT	W		L	PCT
Chicago	10	–	2	.833	14	–	4	.778
Purdue	8	–	2	.800	16	–	4	.800
Illinois	8	–	4	.667	9	–	4	.692
Indiana	6	–	4	.600	13	–	8	.619
Wisconsin	7	–	5	.583	15	–	5	.750
Iowa	6	–	6	.500	9	–	10	.474
Ohio State	3	–	9	.250	17	–	10	.630
Minnesota	3	–	9	.250	7	–	9	.438
Michigan	3	–	9	.250	10	–	13	.435
Northwestern	2	–	6	.250	3	–	7	.300

The 1919–20 Indiana Hoosiers men's basketball team represented Indiana University. Their head coach was Ewald O. Stiehm, who was in his first and only year. The team played its home games at the Men's Gymnasium in Bloomington, Indiana, and was a member of the Big Ten Conference.

The Hoosiers finished the regular season with an overall record of 13–8 and a conference record of 6–4, finishing 4th in the Big Ten Conference.

== Roster ==
Name	Position	Year	Hometown
Arlo Byrum	G	Sr.	Anderson, Indiana
Everett Dean	C	Jr.	Salem, Indiana
William Dobbins	G	Jr.	Bloomington, Indiana
Harry Donovan	C	Jr.	South Bend, Indiana
Ralph Esarey	G	N/A	Bloomington, Indiana
Urban Jeffries	F	Sr.	Rockville, Indiana
John Kyle	F	Jr.	Gary, Indiana
Ardith Phillips	G	Sr.	Amo, Indiana
Gilbert Rhea	F	N/A	Clayton, Indiana
Russell Hauss	G	So.	Sellersburg, Indiana
Herm Schuler	F	Jr.	Elkhart, Indiana
Markham Wakefield	F	Sr.	Worthington, Indiana
Heber Williams	F	Sr.	Kokomo, Indiana
William Zellar	G	Sr.	Brazil, Indiana

== Schedule/results ==
Date time, TV	Rank^{#}	Opponent^{#}	Result	Record	Site city, state
Regular season
12/12/1919*		North American Gymnastic Union	W 32–10	1–0	Men's Gymnasium; Bloomington, IN
12/13/1919*		Hanover	W 46–5	2–0	Men's Gymnasium; Bloomington, IN
12/18/1919*		Valparaiso	W 24–15	3–0	Men's Gymnasium; Bloomington, IN
12/29/1919*		at Huntington Athletic Club	L 15–22	3–1	Huntington, IN
12/30/1919*		at Merchants Heat and Light	L 28–33	3–2	Indianapolis, IN
1/9/1920*		at Ohio Wesleyan	W 38–21	4–2	Delaware, OH
1/10/1920		at Ohio State	W 22–11	5–2 (1–0)	Columbus, OH
1/16/1920*		at Michigan State	W 20–19	6–2 (1–0)	IM Circle; East Lansing, MI
1/17/1920		at Michigan	W 22–9	7–2 (2–0)	Waterman Gymnasium; Ann Arbor, MI
1/23/1920		Purdue; Rivalry	L 9–17	7–3 (2–1)	Men's Gymnasium; Bloomington, IN
1/31/1920		Northwestern	W 32–11	8–3 (3–1)	Men's Gymnasium; Bloomington, IN
2/4/1920*		at Creighton	L 20–29	8–4 (3–1)	University Gym; Omaha, NE
2/5/1920*		at Nebraska	W 24–20	9–4 (3–1)	Grant Memorial Hall; Lincoln, NE
2/6/1920*		at Nebraska	L 18–38	9–5 (3–1)	Grant Memorial Hall; Lincoln, NE
2/7/1920		at Iowa	L 20–28	9–6 (3–2)	Iowa Armory; Iowa City, IA
2/13/1920		Iowa	W 25–19	10–6 (4–2)	Men's Gymnasium; Bloomington, IN
2/19/1920*		Cincinnati	W 36–12	11–6 (4–2)	Men's Gymnasium; Bloomington, IN
2/25/1920		at Purdue; Rivalry	L 20–31	11–7 (4–3)	Memorial Gymnasium; West Lafayette, IN
2/28/1920		Ohio State	W 17–16	12–7 (5–3)	Men's Gymnasium; Bloomington, IN
3/6/1920		at Northwestern	L 34–36	12–8 (5–4)	Old Patten Gymnasium; Evanston, IL
3/15/1920		Michigan	W 19–18	13–8 (6–4)	Men's Gymnasium; Bloomington, IN
*Non-conference game. ^{#}Rankings from AP Poll. (#) Tournament seedings in parentheses.
