= 1920–21 Illinois Fighting Illini men's basketball team =

American college basketball season

1920–21 Illinois Fighting Illini men's basketball
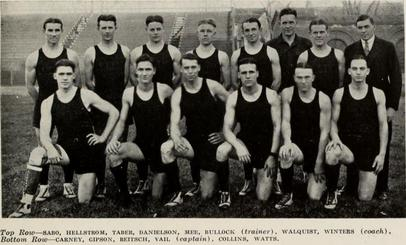
- Conference: Big Ten Conference
- Record: 11–7 (7–5 Big Ten)
- Head coach: Frank Winters (1st season)
- Captain: Charles Vail
- Home arena: Kenney Gym

1920–21 Big Ten Conference men's basketball standings
	Conf.				Overall
Team	W		L	PCT	W		L	PCT
Michigan	8	–	4	.667	18	–	4	.818
Wisconsin	8	–	4	.667	13	–	4	.765
Purdue	8	–	4	.667	13	–	7	.650
Minnesota	7	–	5	.583	10	–	5	.667
Illinois	7	–	5	.583	11	–	7	.611
Indiana	6	–	5	.545	15	–	6	.714
Iowa	6	–	5	.545	9	–	9	.500
Chicago	6	–	6	.500	14	–	6	.700
Ohio State	2	–	10	.167	4	–	13	.235
Northwestern	1	–	11	.083	2	–	12	.143

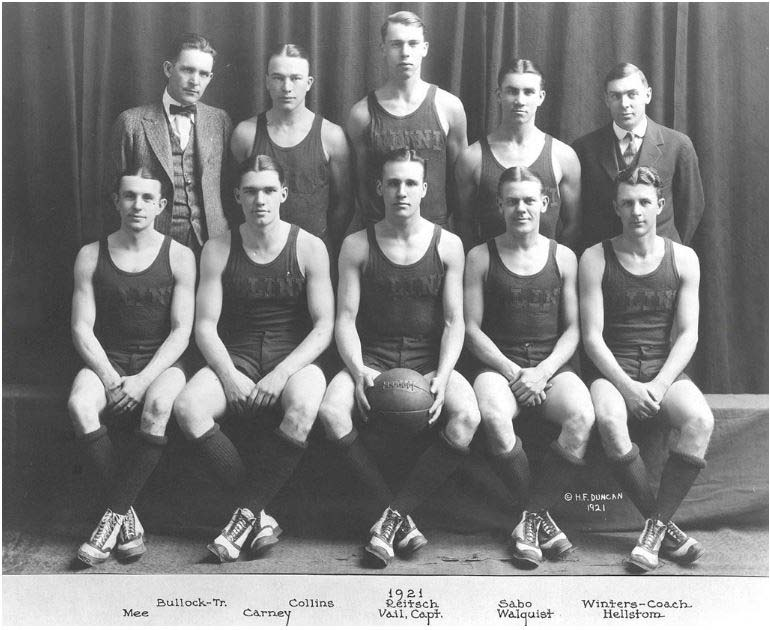
"1920-21 Fighting Illini men's basketball team"

The 1920–21 Illinois Fighting Illini men's basketball team represented the University of Illinois.

== Regular season ==
The 1920–21 season began a new era for the Illinois Fighting Illini men's basketball team. New head coach Frank Winters was coming to the University of Illinois after five successful years as head coach of Rockford Central High School in Rockford, Illinois. During his tenure in Rockford, he guided his Rabs teams to three round of 16 finishes, one quarterfinals finish and one team finished its season as state champions. Winters inherited a team whose best player, Chuck Carney, severely injured his knee in the last football game. The team went on to an overall record of 11–7. The Big Ten record for the Illini, at the conclusion of the 1920–21 season was seven wins five losses and a tie for fourth place. The starting lineup included All-American Chuck Carney, Laurie Walquist and Norton Hellstrom at forward, Henry Reitsch at center, and Charles Vail, John Sabo and Walter Collins as guards.

=== Roster ===
1920–21 Illinois Fighting Illini men's basketball team
Players
Coaches

Pos.	#	Name	Height	Weight	Year	Hometown
F	1	Chuck Carney	—	—	Jr	Evanston, Illinois
G	2	Walter Collins	—	—	Jr	Rockford, Illinois
G	3	John Sabo	—	—	Jr	Toledo, Ohio
C	4	Henry Reitsch	—	—	So	Rockford, Illinois
C	5	Leland "Slim" Stillwell	—	—	Fr	Olney, Illinois
G	6	Otto Vogel	—	—	So	Iowa City, Iowa
F	7	Roland H. Popken	—	—	Fr	Oak Park, Illinois
F	8	Norton Hellstrom	—	—	So	Ft. Pierce, Florida
F	9	Glenn E. Potter	—	—	Fr	Yuba City, California
G	10	Hubert Tabor	—	—	Jr	Sullivan, Illinois
F	11	Charles Milton White	—	—	So	Chicago, Illinois
F	12	Harry Clay Neville	—	—	So	Pinckneyville, Illinois
G	13	John Wilbur Hansen	—	—	So	Brookston, Indiana
F	14	Cecil Reynolds Danielson	—	—	So	Rockford, Illinois
G	15	Charles W. Vail (C)	—	—	Jr	Chicago, Illinois
G	16	Lawrence Walquist	—	—	Jr	Chicago, Illinois
F	17	Julian Mee	—	—	Sr	Chicago, Illinois

Head coach

- Frank Winters (Springfield (MA)) (1st year)

Assistant coach(es)

Legend

- (C) Team captain
- (S) Suspended
- (I) Ineligible
- (W) Walk-on
- Injured
- Current redshirt

Roster

== Schedule ==
Date time, TV	Rank^{#}	Opponent^{#}	Result	Record	Site (attendance) city, state
Non-Conference regular season
12/8/1920*		Millikin University	L 24–29	0-1	Kenney Gym (2,994); Urbana, IL
12/20/1920*		at Illinois Normal	W 32–21	1-1	John W. Cook Hall (-); Normal, IL
1/1/1921*		Nebraska	L 25–30	1-2	Kenney Gym (441); Urbana, IL
1/3/1921*		Nebraska	W 26–24	2-2	Kenney Gym (3,044); Urbana, IL
1/10/1921*		Illinois Normal	W 42–17	3-2	Kenney Gym (2,759); Urbana, IL
1/14/1921*		at Millikin University	W 26–20	4-2	Millikin Gymnasium (-); Decatur, IL
Big Ten regular season
1/18/1921		University of Chicago	W 33–29	5-2 (1-0)	Kenney Gym (4,233); Urbana, IL
1/22/1921		at Wisconsin	L 18–23	5-3 (1-1)	University of Wisconsin Armory and Gymnasium (-); Madison, WI
1/24/1921		at Minnesota	W 23–22	6-3 (2-1)	University of Minnesota Armory (-); Minneapolis, MN
2/5/1921		at Purdue	W 39–26	7-3 (3-1)	Memorial Gymnasium (-); West Lafayette, IN
2/7/1921		Ohio State	W 46–11	8-3 (4-1)	Kenney Gym (4,272); Urbana, IL
2/12/1921		Minnesota	W 24–20	9-3 (5-1)	Kenney Gym (4,272); Urbana, IL
2/19/1921		Wisconsin	W 17–9	10-3 (6-1)	Kenney Gym (4,283); Urbana, IL
2/22/1921		Purdue	L 19–29	10-4 (6-2)	Kenney Gym (4,283); Urbana, IL
2/26/1921		at Michigan	L 18–24	10-5 (6-3)	Waterman Gymnasium (-); Ann Arbor, MI
2/28/1921		at Ohio State	W 35–32	11-5 (7-3)	Ohio Expo Center Coliseum (-); Columbus, OH
3/5/1921		at University of Chicago	W 35–32	11-6 (7-4)	Bartlett Gymnasium (3,260); Chicago, IL
3/7/1921		at Michigan	L 26–28	11-7 (7-5)	Kenney Gym (4,294); Urbana, IL
*Non-conference game. ^{#}Rankings from AP Poll. (#) Tournament seedings in parentheses. All times are in Central Time.

== Player stats ==
Player	Games played	Field goals	Free throws	Points
Henry Reitsch	18	55	0	110
Charles Vail	18	22	59	103
Julian Mee	15	24	26	74
Laurie Walquist	18	36	1	73
Norton Hellstrom	13	25	4	54
Charles Carney	8	19	0	38
Walter Collins	14	12	0	24
John Sabo	14	6	0	12

== Awards and honors ==
Chuck Carney was elected to the "Illini Men's Basketball All-Century Team" in 2004. Carney was also selected as the Helms Foundation College Basketball Player of the Year for his play during the 1921–22 season.
