= 1920–21 Michigan Wolverines men's basketball team =

American college basketball season

1920–21 Michigan Wolverines men's basketball
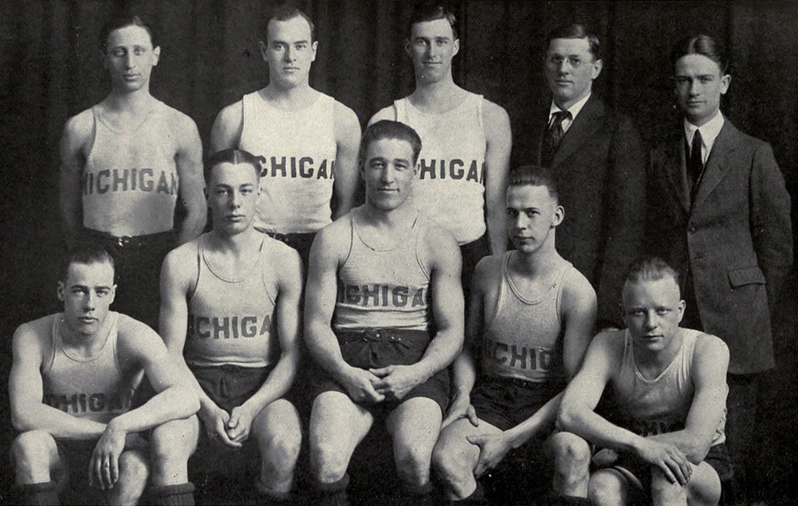

Big Ten regular season co-champions
- Conference: Big Ten Conference
- Record: 18–4 (8–4 Big Nine)
- Head coach: E. J. Mather
- Captain: Arthur Karpus

1920–21 Big Ten Conference men's basketball standings
	Conf.				Overall
Team	W		L	PCT	W		L	PCT
Michigan	8	–	4	.667	18	–	4	.818
Wisconsin	8	–	4	.667	13	–	4	.765
Purdue	8	–	4	.667	13	–	7	.650
Minnesota	7	–	5	.583	10	–	5	.667
Illinois	7	–	5	.583	11	–	7	.611
Indiana	6	–	5	.545	15	–	6	.714
Iowa	6	–	5	.545	9	–	9	.500
Chicago	6	–	6	.500	14	–	6	.700
Ohio State	2	–	10	.167	4	–	13	.235
Northwestern	1	–	11	.083	2	–	12	.143

The 1920–21 Michigan Wolverines men's basketball team represented the University of Michigan in intercollegiate college basketball during the 1920–21 season. The team won its first eight games and its last eight games to finish tied with the Purdue Boilermakers and Wisconsin Badgers for the Western Conference Championship. Arthur Karpus served as team captain. On January 29, 1921, the team began a 14-game winning streak against the University of Chicago that continued through a January 6, 1922, victory over Michigan State University, which was at the time known as Michigan Agricultural college. This stood as the longest winning streak in school history until 1985. The team was also involved in setting the longest road winning streaks at the time. It won on January 22, 1921, against Northwestern ending a 7-game road winning streak that had started on December 27, 1920, against the Louisville YMCA. Then on January 29, the team started another 7-game road winning streak against Chicago that lasted until a December 17, 1921, victory at Case. These two 7-game streaks stood as the school road winning streak record until 1985.

== Schedule ==
Date	Opponent	Score	Result	Location
December 10, 1920	Kalamazoo College	44–32	Win	Waterman Gymnasium, Ann Arbor, MI
December 18, 1920	Western State Normal	44–32	Win	Waterman Gymnasium, Ann Arbor, MI
December 27, 1920	Louisville YMCA	32–18	Win	Louisville, KY
December 28, 1920	Nashville	28–16	Win	Nashville, TN
December 29, 1920	Jonesboro	24–16	Win	Jonesboro, TN
December 30, 1920	Memphis YMCA	14–11	Win	Memphis, TN
December 31, 1920	Nashville	28–11	Win	Nashville, TN
January 1, 1921	Vanderbilt	21–7	Win	Nashville, TN
January 8, 1921	Wisconsin	27–24	Loss	Waterman Gymnasium, Ann Arbor, MI
January 10, 1921	Indiana	30–21	Loss	Waterman Gymnasium, Ann Arbor, MI
January 15, 1921	Ohio State	22–10	Loss	Waterman Gymnasium, Ann Arbor, MI
January 21, 1921	Iowa	19–15	Win	Waterman Gymnasium, Ann Arbor, MI
January 22, 1921	Northwestern	30–15	Loss	Evanston, IL
January 24, 1921	Wisconsin	25–17	Loss	Madison, WI
January 29, 1921	Chicago	16–14	Win	Bartlett Gymnasium, Chicago, IL
January 31, 1921	Purdue	27–23	Win	Lafayette, IN
February 5, 1921	Michigan Agricultural	37–24	Win	Waterman Gymnasium, Ann Arbor, MI
February 22, 1921	Michigan Agricultural	17–10	Win	Lansing, MI
February 26, 1921	Illinois	24–18	Win	Waterman Gymnasium, Ann Arbor, MI
February 28, 1921	Purdue	19–15	Win	Waterman Gymnasium, Ann Arbor, MI
March 5, 1921	Ohio State	36–22	Win	Columbus, OH
March 7, 1921	Illinois	26–24	Win	Kenney Gym, Urbana, IL

== Players ==
- R. Jerome Dunne, Chicago, Illinois - center and varsity letter winner
- R. Gregory - aMa letter winner
- Arthur Karpus, Grayling, Michigan - forward, captain, and varsity letter winner
- Kenneth B. LeGalley - guard and varsity letter winner
- George W. "Bill" Miller - forward and varsity letter winner
- Robert S. Peare, Rockville, Indiana
- Charles L. Pearman, Verona, New York - aMa letter winner
- William J. Piper, Calumet, Michigan - aMa letter winner
- Walter B. "Bud" Rea, Erie, Pennsylvania - guard and varsity letter winner
- Rex G. Reason, Detroit, Michigan
- Howard Elmer Rowse, Detroit, Michigan
- Raymond W. Walmoth, Detroit, Michigan - aMa letter winner
- Benjamin Weiss, Newark, New Jersey - center and varsity letter winner
- Robert C. Whitlock, Detroit, Michigan - forward and varsity letter winner
- Frederick B. Wickham, Norwalk, Ohio - aMa letter winner
- Jack G. Williams, Detroit, Michigan - guard and varsity letter winner
- Lincoln B. Wilson, Chicago, Illinois - aMa letter winner
- Bernard F. Zinn, Huntington, Indiana - aMa letter winner

== Scoring statistics ==
Player	Games	Field goals	Free throws	Points	Points per game
Arthur Karpus	15	29	80	138	9.2
William Miller	15	44	0	88	5.9
R. Jerome Dunne	12	24	0	48	4.0
Walter B. Rea	14	19	0	38	2.7
Robert Whitlock	13	18	1	37	2.8
Benjamin Weiss	7	8	9	25	3.6
Jack Williams	16	8	0	16	1.0
Kenneth LeGalley	2	2	0	4	2.0
Rex Reason	2	1	0	2	1.0
Wilford Wilson	4	0	0	0	0.0
Robert Peare	3	0	0	0	0.0
Howard Rowse	1	0	0	0	0.0
Charles Pearman	1	0	0	0	0.0
Incomplete Totals	17	153	90	396	23.3

- The scoring statistics do not include six games of Southern tour.

== Coaching staff ==
- E. J. Mather - coach
- Boyd H. Logan - manager
