= Harlan Page =

American sports player and coach

Biographical details
- Born: March 20, 1887; Chicago, Illinois, U.S.
- Died: November 23, 1965 (aged 78); Watervliet, Michigan, U.S.

Playing career

Football
- 1907–1909: Chicago

Basketball
- 1906–1910: Chicago
- Positions: End (football); Guard (basketball); Pitcher (baseball)

Coaching career (HC unless noted)

Football
- 1911–1919: Chicago (assistant)
- 1920–1925: Butler
- 1926–1930: Indiana
- 1932: Chicago (assistant)
- 1936–1937: College of Idaho

Basketball
- 1911–1920: Chicago
- 1920–1926: Butler
- 1936–1938: College of Idaho

Baseball
- 1913–1920: Chicago
- 1931: Chicago

Head coaching record
- Overall: 58–46–7 (football); 269–140 (basketball); 63–35 (baseball)

Accomplishments and honors

Championships
- As player: 3× Helms National Champion (1907–1909); As coach: Big Ten (1920); AAU (1924)

Awards
- Basketball: National Player of the Year (1910); 3× All-American (1908-1910); Football: Second-team All-American (1909); Third-team All-American (1908); 3× All-Western (1907-1909)
- Basketball Hall of Fame; Inducted in 1962 (profile)
- College Basketball Hall of Fame; Inducted in 2006

Harlan Orville "Pat" Page (March 20, 1887 – November 23, 1965) was an American football, basketball, and baseball player and coach. He was one of basketball's first star players in the early 1900s. The 5'9" Chicago native played guard at the University of Chicago (1906–1910) and was known as a defensive specialist. While leading Chicago to three national championships (1907–1909), the Helms Athletic Foundation retroactively named him an All-American each time and named National Player of the Year in 1910. Page also played football at Chicago. Walter Camp selected him as a second-team All-American at the end in 1908 and a third-team All-American at the same position in 1909.

Following his playing days, Page embarked on a coaching career. He served as the head basketball coach at the University of Chicago (1911–1920), Butler University (1920–1925) and the College of Idaho (1936–1938), compiling a career college basketball record of 269–140. In 1924, he coached Butler to the AAU title. Page was also the head football coach at Butler from 1920 to 1925, at Indiana University from 1926 to 1930 and at the College of Idaho from 1936 to 1937, tallying a career college football mark of 58–46–7. In addition, Page coached baseball at the University of Chicago from 1913 to 1920 and again in 1931, amassing a record of 63–35. In 1962, he was enshrined in the Naismith Memorial Basketball Hall of Fame as a player.

== Head coaching record ==
=== Football ===
Year	Team	Overall	Conference	Standing	Bowl/playoffs
Butler Bulldogs (Independent) (1920–1925)
1920	Butler	7–1			
1921	Butler	6–2			
1922	Butler	8–2			
1923	Butler	7–2			
1924	Butler	4–5			
1925	Butler	5–2–2			
Butler:		37–14–2			
Indiana Hoosiers (Big Ten Conference) (1926–1930)
1926	Indiana	3–5	0–4	8th	
1927	Indiana	3–4–1	1–2–1	8th	
1928	Indiana	4–4	2–4	9th	
1929	Indiana	2–6–1	1–3–1	T–7th	
1930	Indiana	2–5–1	1–3	T–6th	
Indiana:		14–24–3	5–16–2		
College of Idaho Coyotes (Northwest Conference) (1936–1937)
1936	College of Idaho	5–3–1	1–2–1	5th	
1937	College of Idaho	2–5–1	0–2–1	5th	
College of Idaho:		7–8–2	1–4–2		
Total:		58–46–7			

=== Basketball ===
Record table
Season	Team	Overall	Conference	Standing	Postseason
Chicago Maroons (Western Conference / Big Ten Conference) (1911–1920)
1911–12	Chicago	12–6	7–5	3rd	
1912–13	Chicago	20–6	8–4	3rd	
1913–14	Chicago	19–9	8–4	3rd	
1914–15	Chicago	20–5	9–3	2nd	
1915–16	Chicago	15–11	4–8	T–7th	
1916–17	Chicago	13–15	4–8	6th	
1917–18	Chicago	14–10	6–6	4th	
1918–19	Chicago	21–6	10–2	2nd	
1919–20	Chicago	27–8	10–2	1st	
Chicago:		161–76 (.679)	66–42 (.611)		
Butler Bulldogs (Independent) (1920–1926)
1920–21	Butler	16–4			
1921–22	Butler	19–6			
1922–23	Butler	16–4			
1923–24	Butler	11–7			AAU Champions
1924–25	Butler	20–4			
1925–26	Butler	16–5			
Butler:		98–36			
College of Idaho Coyotes (Northwest Conference) (1936–1938)
1936–37	College of Idaho	5–20			
1937–38	College of Idaho	5–18			
College of Idaho:		10–28 (.263)			
Total:		269–140 (.658)			
National champion Postseason invitational champion Conference regular season champion Conference regular season and conference tournament champion Division regular season champion Division regular season and conference tournament champion Conference tournament champion
