= 1919–20 Illinois Fighting Illini men's basketball team =

American college basketball season

1919–20 Illinois Fighting Illini men's basketball
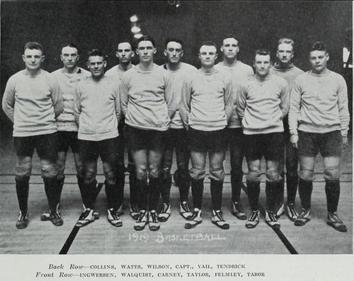
- Conference: Big Ten Conference
- Record: 9–4 (8–4 Big Ten)
- Head coach: Ralph Jones (8th season)
- Captain: Kenneth L. Wilson
- Home arena: Kenney Gym

1919–20 Big Ten Conference men's basketball standings
	Conf.				Overall
Team	W		L	PCT	W		L	PCT
Chicago	10	–	2	.833	14	–	4	.778
Purdue	8	–	2	.800	16	–	4	.800
Illinois	8	–	4	.667	9	–	4	.692
Indiana	6	–	4	.600	13	–	8	.619
Wisconsin	7	–	5	.583	15	–	5	.750
Iowa	6	–	6	.500	9	–	10	.474
Ohio State	3	–	9	.250	17	–	10	.630
Minnesota	3	–	9	.250	7	–	9	.438
Michigan	3	–	9	.250	10	–	13	.435
Northwestern	2	–	6	.250	3	–	7	.300

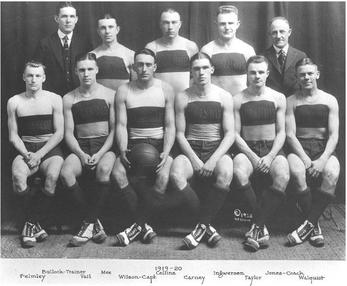
"1919-20 Fighting Illini men's basketball team"

The 1919–20 Illinois Fighting Illini men's basketball team represented the University of Illinois.

== Regular season ==
The 1919–20 Fighting Illini men's basketball season was the final of eight seasons for head coach Ralph Jones. This group was slightly better than the previous as they bounced back from the first losing season of Jones' career and finished third in the Big Ten. The campaign began with a six-game home winning streak; however, over the next seven games, the team posted only three wins, while losing four. After Jones left Illinois, he went to Lake Forest Academy in Lake Forest, Illinois. He coached both basketball and football at the academy for 10 years. His football team won 76 games and lost six in his ten years. His basketball teams had a ten-year record of 94 wins and 9 losses. The record the Illini had at the conclusion of the 1919–20 season was nine wins and four losses overall with an eight-win, four-loss conference mark. The starting lineup included captain K. L. Wilson, J. B. Felmley, Julian Mee and P. C. Taylor rotating at the forward positions, All-American Chuck Carney at center, and Charles Vail, Burt Ingwersen, and Laurie Walquist as guards.

=== Roster ===
1919–20 Illinois Fighting Illini men's basketball team
Players
Coaches

Pos.	#	Name	Height	Weight	Year	Hometown
C		Chuck Carney	—	—	So	Evanston, Illinois
G		Burt Ingwersen	—	—	Sr	Urbana, Illinois
G		Paul C. Taylor	—	—	Sr	New Orleans, Louisiana
F		Kenneth L. Wilson (C)	—	—	Sr	Wilmette, Illinois
F		Julian Mee	—	—	Jr	Chicago, Illinois
F		John B. Felmley	—	—	Sr	Bloomington, Illinois
G		Chuck W. Vail	—	—	So	Chicago, Illinois
G		Walter Collins	—	—	So	Rockford, Illinois
G		Lawrence Walquist	—	—	So	Chicago, Illinois
F		John B. Felmley	—	—	Sr	Bloomington, Illinois
G		Hubert Tabor	—	—	So	Sullivan, Illinois

Head coach

- Ralph Jones (Indianapolis YMCA Training School) (8th year)

Assistant coach(es)

Legend

- (C) Team captain
- (S) Suspended
- (I) Ineligible
- (W) Walk-on
- Injured
- Current redshirt

Roster

== Schedule ==
Date time, TV	Rank^{#}	Opponent^{#}	Result	Record	Site (attendance) city, state
Non-Conference regular season
1/5/1920*		Northwestern College	W 24–12	1-0	Kenney Gym (2,468); Urbana, IL
Big Ten regular season
1/10/1920		Purdue	W 33–31	2-0 (1-0)	Kenney Gym (-); Urbana, IL
1/12/1920		Ohio State	W 40–22	3-0 (2-0)	Kenney Gym (4,405); Urbana, IL
1/17/1920		Minnesota	W 31–19	4-0 (3-0)	Kenney Gym (4,357); Urbana, IL
1/24/1920		Wisconsin	W 43–20	5-0 (4-0)	Kenney Gym (4,300); Urbana, IL
1/26/1920		Michigan	W 41–14	6-0 (5-0)	Kenney Gym (4,300); Urbana, IL
2/7/1920		at Purdue	L 20–36	6-1 (5-1)	Memorial Gymnasium (-); West Lafayette, IN
2/9/1920		at Ohio State	W 35–27	7-1 (6-1)	Ohio Expo Center Coliseum (-); Columbus, OH
2/14/1920		University of Chicago	L 21–23	7-2 (6-2)	Kenney Gym (4,420); Urbana, IL
2/21/1920		at Wisconsin	L 29–33	7-3 (6-3)	University of Wisconsin Armory and Gymnasium (-); Madison, WI
2/23/1920		at Minnesota	W 26–20	8-3 (7-3)	University of Minnesota Armory (-); Minneapolis, MN
2/28/1920		at University of Chicago	L 20–27	8-4 (7-4)	Bartlett Gymnasium (-); Chicago, IL
3/1/1920		at Michigan	W 28–21	9-4 (8-4)	Waterman Gymnasium (-); Ann Arbor, MI
*Non-conference game. ^{#}Rankings from AP Poll. (#) Tournament seedings in parentheses. All times are in Central Time.

== Player stats ==
Player	Games played	Field goals	Free throws	Points
Charles Carney	13	65	76	206
John Felmley	10	34	3	71
Paul Taylor	13	31	0	62
Lawrence Walquist	12	14	0	28
Julian Mee	4	5	0	10
Burt Ingwersen	7	4	0	14
Charles Vail	12	2	0	4
Kenneth Wilson	4	1	0	2

== Awards and honors ==
Chuck Carney was elected to the "Illini Men's Basketball All-Century Team" in 2004. Carney was also selected as an All-American for the 1919–20 season and became the Helms Foundation College Basketball Player of the Year for his play during the 1921–22 season.
