= 1920–21 Wisconsin Badgers men's basketball team =

American college basketball season

1920–21 Wisconsin Badgers men's basketball

Big Ten Conference Co–Champions
- Conference: Big Ten Conference
- Record: 13–4 (8–4 Big Ten)
- Head coach: Walter Meanwell
- Home arena: Red Gym

1920–21 Big Ten Conference men's basketball standings
	Conf.				Overall
Team	W		L	PCT	W		L	PCT
Michigan	8	–	4	.667	18	–	4	.818
Wisconsin	8	–	4	.667	13	–	4	.765
Purdue	8	–	4	.667	13	–	7	.650
Minnesota	7	–	5	.583	10	–	5	.667
Illinois	7	–	5	.583	11	–	7	.611
Indiana	6	–	5	.545	15	–	6	.714
Iowa	6	–	5	.545	9	–	9	.500
Chicago	6	–	6	.500	14	–	6	.700
Ohio State	2	–	10	.167	4	–	13	.235
Northwestern	1	–	11	.083	2	–	12	.143

The 1920–21 Wisconsin Badgers men's basketball team represented University of Wisconsin–Madison. The head coach was Walter Meanwell, coaching his seventh season with the Badgers. The team played their home games at the Red Gym in Madison, Wisconsin and was a member of the Big Ten Conference.

== Schedule ==
Date time, TV	Rank^{#}	Opponent^{#}	Result	Record	Site city, state
Regular Season
12/10/1920*		Knox (IL)	W 29–16	1–0	Red Gym; Madison, WI
12/12/1920*		River Falls (WI)	W 28–8	2–0	Red Gym; Madison, WI
12/17/1920*		at La Crosse (WI)	W 24–14	3–0	La Crosse, WI
12/18/1920*		at Marquette	W 23–18	4–0	Milwaukee, WI
12/29/1920*		South Dakota	W 25–10	5–0	Red Gym; Madison, WI
1/03/1921		at Northwestern	L 12–13	5–1 (0–1)	Patten Gymnasium; Evanston, IL
1/08/1921		at Michigan	W 27–24	6–1 (1–1)	Waterman Gymnasium; Ann Arbor, MI
1/15/1921		at Chicago	L 27–39	6–2 (1–2)	Bartlett Gymnasium; Chicago, IL
1/22/1921		Illinois	W 23–18	7–2 (2–2)	Red Gym; Madison, WI
1/24/1921		Michigan	W 25–17	8–2 (3–2)	Red Gym; Madison, WI
1/29/1921		at Minnesota	L 21–22	8–3 (3–3)	Minnesota Armory; Minneapolis, MN
2/12/1921		Northwestern	W 22–10	9–3 (4–3)	Red Gym; Madison, WI
2/19/1921		at Illinois	L 9–17	9–4 (4–4)	Kenney Gym; Urbana, IL
2/21/1921		at Ohio State	W 42–25	10–4 (5–4)	Ohio Expo Center Coliseum; Columbus, OH
2/26/1921		Chicago	W 25–19	11–4 (6–4)	Red Gym; Madison, WI
3/05/1921		Minnesota	W 18–12	12–4 (7–4)	Red Gym; Madison, WI
3/08/1921		Ohio State	W 34–24	13–4 (8–4)	Red Gym; Madison, WI
*Non-conference game. ^{#}Rankings from AP Poll. (#) Tournament seedings in parentheses.
