= 1921–22 Purdue Boilermakers men's basketball team =

American college basketball season

1921–22 Purdue Boilermakers men's basketball

Big Ten Conference Champions
- Conference: Big Ten Conference
- Record: 15–3 (8–1 Big Ten)
- Head coach: Ward Lambert (5th season)
- Captain: Ray Miller
- Home arena: Memorial Gymnasium

1921–22 Big Ten Conference men's basketball standings
	Conf.				Overall
Team	W		L	PCT	W		L	PCT
Purdue	8	–	1	.889	15	–	3	.833
Michigan	8	–	4	.667	15	–	4	.789
Wisconsin	8	–	4	.667	14	–	5	.737
Illinois	7	–	5	.583	14	–	5	.737
Iowa	5	–	6	.455	11	–	7	.611
Chicago	5	–	7	.417	15	–	15	.500
Ohio State	5	–	7	.417	8	–	10	.444
Minnesota	4	–	7	.364	5	–	8	.385
Indiana	3	–	7	.300	10	–	10	.500
Northwestern	3	–	9	.250	7	–	11	.389

The 1921–22 Purdue Boilermakers men's basketball team represented Purdue University during the 1921–22 NCAA men's basketball season in the United States. The head coach was Ward Lambert, coaching in his 5th season with the Boilermakers. The team finished the season with a 15–3 record, claiming the Big Ten championship with a conference record of 8–1.

The team also contained several future coaches; Don White coached at Washington University, UConn, and Rutgers; Blair Gullion at Earlham and Washington University, among others.

== Lineup ==
- Ted Chafee, Senior (Forward)
- George Eversman, Junior (Forward)
- Blair Gullion, Sophomore (Center)
- E. H. Hawkins, Sophomore (Forward)
- Walter Hiser, Senior (Guard)
- Don Holwerda, Junior (Guard)
- Milton Leverenz, Senior (Forward)
- E. A. Long, Junior (Forward)
- A. B. "Abie" Masters, Junior (Forward)
- Ray "Candy" Miller, Senior Capt. (Guard)
- F. L. Tavis, Sophomore (Forward)
- Don White, Graduate (Guard) – declared ineligible during the season
- T. H. Witter, Sophomore (Guard)
- Kriegbaum
- Little
- Treat
- R. L. Green, Senior (Student Manager)

== Schedule and results ==
Date time, TV	Rank^{#}	Opponent^{#}	Result	Record	Site city, state
Regular season
12/14/1921*		Franklin	W 43–22	1–0	Memorial Gymnasium; West Lafayette, Indiana
12/16/1921*		Rose Poly	W 33–10	2–0	Memorial Gymnasium; West Lafayette, Indiana
12/18/1921*		Butler	W 42–19	3–0	Memorial Gymnasium; West Lafayette, Indiana
12/21/1921*		Chamber of Commerce	W 26–19	4–0	Memorial Gymnasium; West Lafayette, Indiana
12/29/1921*		at Wabash	W 34–25	5–0	Wabash, Indiana
12/31/1921*		at DePauw	L 27–32	5–1	Greencastle, Indiana
1/2/1922*		Colgate	W 31–25	6–1	Memorial Gymnasium; West Lafayette, Indiana
1/6/1922*		Camp Benning	W 42–26	7–1	Memorial Gymnasium; West Lafayette, Indiana
1/16/1922		Northwestern	W 32–19	8–1 (1–0)	Memorial Gymnasium; West Lafayette, Indiana
1/21/1922		at Iowa	W 27–26	9–1 (2–0)	Second Iowa Armory; Iowa City, Iowa
1/23/1922		at Northwestern	W 31–14	10–1 (3–0)	Patten Gymnasium; Evanston, Illinois
1/28/1922		Iowa	W 27–26	11–1 (4–0)	Memorial Gymnasium; West Lafayette, Indiana
2/7/1922		at Illinois	L 28–29	11–2 (4–1)	Kenney Gym; Urbana, Illinois
2/11/1922		at Indiana; Rivalry	W 23–19	12–2 (5–1)	Men's Gymnasium; Bloomington, Indiana
2/18/1922		Chicago	W 28–16	13–2 (6–1)	Memorial Gymnasium; West Lafayette, Indiana
2/25/1922		Indiana; Rivalry	W 20–9	14–2 (7–1)	Memorial Gymnasium; West Lafayette, Indiana
3/1/1922*		Wabash	L 27–37	14–3	Memorial Gymnasium; West Lafayette, Indiana
3/7/1922		Illinois	W 39–31	15–3 (8–1)	Memorial Gymnasium; West Lafayette, Indiana
*Non-conference game. ^{#}Rankings from AP Poll. (#) Tournament seedings in parentheses.
