= Ralph O. Rychener =

American physician and basketball player

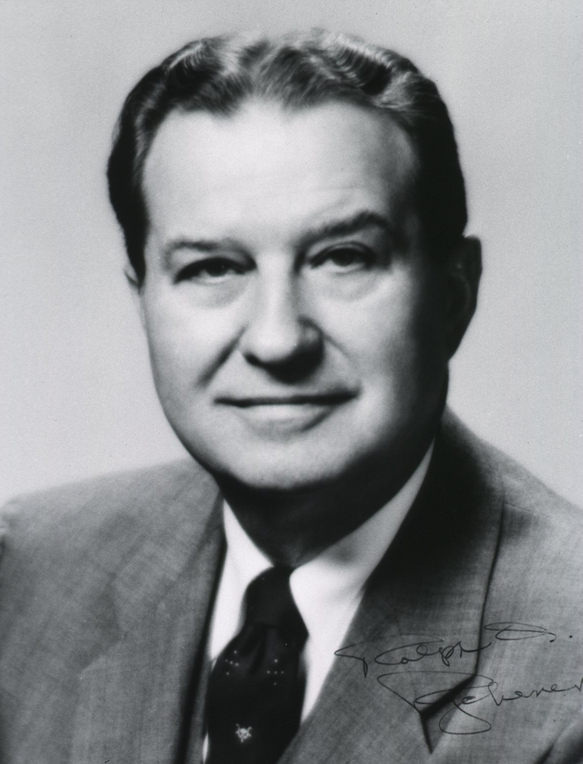
- Rychener portrait from the National Library of Medicine

Personal information
- Born: March 1, 1897 Archbold, Ohio
- Died: February 12, 1962 (aged 64)

Career information
- College: Michigan

Career highlights
- University of Michigan Distinguished Alumni Service Award, 1951

Ralph Orlando Rychener (March 1, 1897 – February 12, 1962) was an American physician and basketball player. He was born in Archbold, Ohio in March 1897. While attending the University of Michigan, he played three years on the school's basketball team. He was one of the leading scorers on the 1917–18 and 1918–19 teams, and the captain of the 1919–20 team. After receiving his medical degree from Michigan, he was a resident at the University of Michigan Hospital for three years. Rychener then moved to Memphis where he practiced as an ophthalmologist for more than 30 years. He also served as an associate professor at the University of Tennessee College of Medicine. He was elected to the American Ophthalmological Society in 1933. In 1951, he received the University of Michigan's Distinguished Alumni Service Award. He died at age 64 in February 1962 from a cerebral hemorrhage.
