= Frank Winters (basketball) =

American football and basketball coach

Biographical details
- Born: March 31, 1894; Fort Madison, Iowa, U.S.
- Died: July 29, 1980 (aged 86); Quincy, Illinois, U.S.
- Education: Springfield (MA)

Coaching career (HC unless noted)
- 1908–1909: Springfield (MA)
- 1910–1912: Central Missouri
- 1912–1913: Madison HS
- 1914–1920: Rockford HS
- 1920–1922: Illinois
- 1922–1928: Oak Park HS

Head coaching record
- Overall: Basketball (120–22, .833); Football (83–26–9, .761)

Accomplishments and honors

Championships
- IHSA Boys Basketball Champion (1919); 2× IHSA Boys Track & Field Champion (1923, 1924)

Frank Winters (March 31, 1894 – July 29, 1980) was an American football and basketball coach in the states of Illinois and Wisconsin.

== Madison High School (WI) ==
Winters began coaching football in 1912 at Madison High School in Madison, Wisconsin. His 2-year stay in Madison brought forth an undefeated season as well as a weather shortened season, compiling a total record of 9 wins and 1 loss.

== Rockford Central High School ==
Winters left Madison and moved south to Rockford, Illinois and began coaching at Rockford Central High School. While at Rockford, Winters' basketball teams compiled 95 wins while suffering only 12 losses. During the 1918–19 season, Winters guided his team to an I.H.S.A. state championship with a 39–20 victory over Springfield High School. During this same time frame, Winters also coached Rockford's football team. Between 1914 and 1919, his football teams won 39 games, lost 12 while tying 3. Rockford joined the Big 7 conference in 1917, with Rockford winning the football title the same year.

== University of Illinois ==
In 1920, Winters departed Rockford and became the head basketball coach of the University of Illinois. During his two-year stint as coach of the Fighting Illini, he had a 25–12 record.

== Oak Park & River Forest ==
After departing from the University of Illinois, Winters returned to high school coaching at Oak Park & River Forest High School. While coaching the Huskies, Winters headed the football and track & field teams. His football teams compiled an overall record of 35 wins, 13 losses and 6 ties. The track & field teams won 2 Illinois Interscholastic state titles.

== Head coaching record ==
=== High school basketball ===
Season	Team	Season Record	Postseason
1915–16	Rockford Central (H.S)	19–2	Elite Eight
1916–17	Rockford Central (H.S)	19–2	Sweet 16
1917–18	Rockford Central (H.S)	19–2	Sweet 16
1918–19	Rockford Central (H.S)	23–1	State Champs
1919–20	Rockford Central (H.S)	15–5	Sweet 16
Total	Rockford Central (H.S.)	95–12	0.887

=== High school football ===
Season	Team	Season Record
1912	Madison High School (WI)	6–0–0
1913	Madison High School (WI)	3–1–0
1914	Rockford Central (H.S)	5–5–0
1915	Rockford Central (H.S)	7–1–1
1916	Rockford Central (H.S)	7–3–1
1917	Rockford Central (H.S)	9–1–0
1918	Rockford Central (H.S)	3–0–1
1919	Rockford Central (H.S)	8–2–0
1922	Oak Park & River Forest (H.S)	7–0–1
1923	Oak Park & River Forest (H.S)	7–1–0
1924	Oak Park & River Forest (H.S)	7–0–1
1925	Oak Park & River Forest (H.S)	6–1–1
1926	Oak Park & River Forest (H.S)	0–5–2
1927	Oak Park & River Forest (H.S)	6–1–0
1928	Oak Park & River Forest (H.S)	2–5–1
Total		83–26–9

=== High school track and field ===
Season	Team	Season Record
1923	Oak Park & River Forest (H.S)	State Champion
1924	Oak Park & River Forest (H.S)	State Champion
Total	Oak Park & River Forest (H.S)	

=== College basketball ===
Season	Team	Season Record	Conf. record	Place
1920–21	Illinois	11–7	7–5	T-4th
1921–22	Illinois	14–5	7–5	T-4th
Total	Illinois	25–12	14–10	
