= 1919–20 Penn Quakers men's basketball team =

American college basketball season

1919–20 Penn Quakers men's basketball
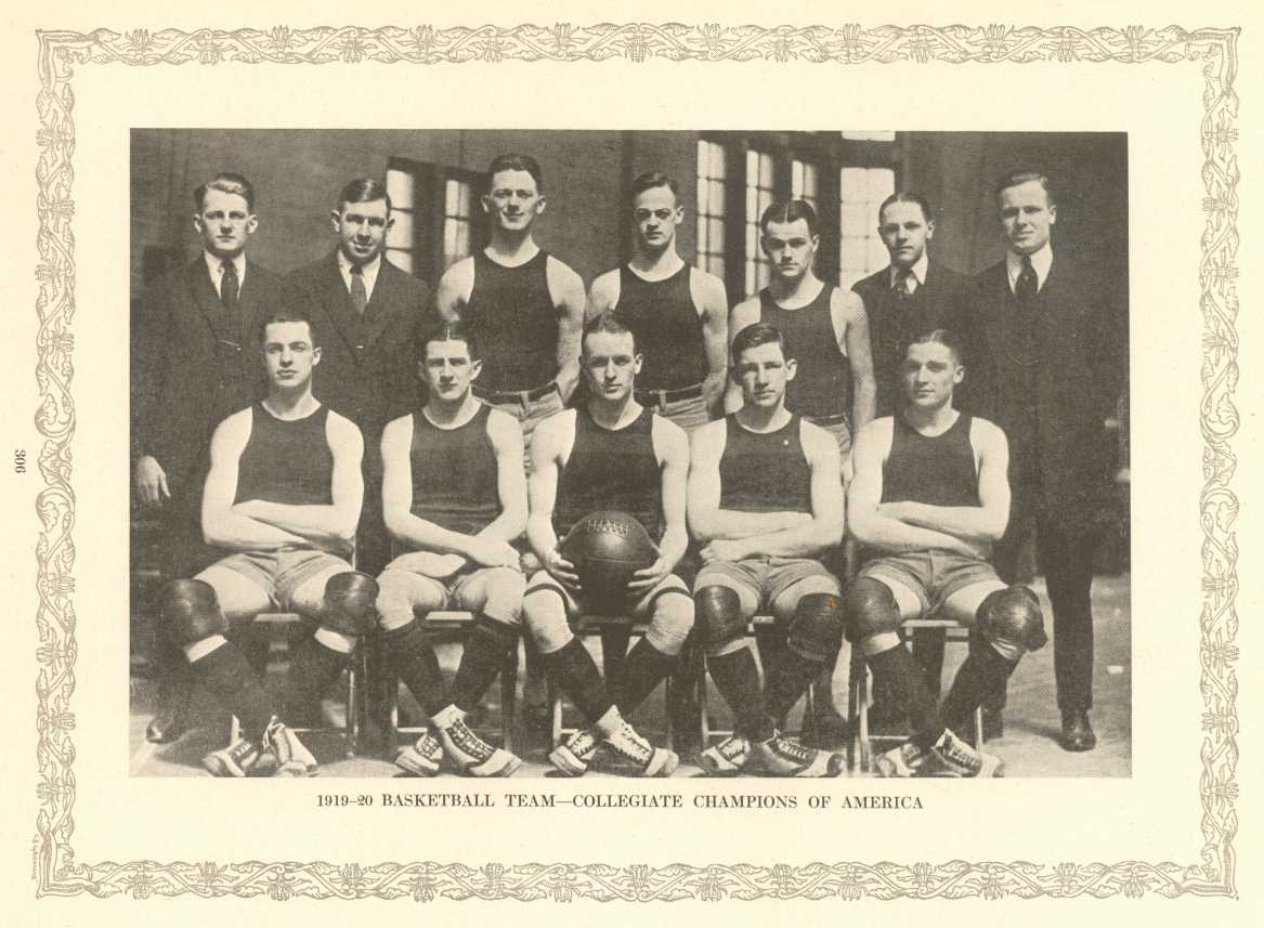
- Collegiate Champions of America

EIBL champions Helms Foundation national champions
- Conference: Eastern Intercollegiate Basketball League
- Record: 21–1 (10–0 EIBL)
- Head coach: Lon Jourdet (6th season)
- Captain: Hubert Peck

1919–20 Eastern Intercollegiate Basketball League standings
	Conf.				Overall
Team	W		L	PCT	W		L	PCT
Penn	10	–	0	1.000	22	–	1	.957
Princeton	6	–	4	.600	16	–	6	.727
Yale	6	–	4	.600	16	–	9	.640
Cornell	4	–	6	.400	14	–	6	.700
Columbia	3	–	7	.300	4	–	10	.286
Dartmouth	1	–	9	.100	5	–	20	.200

The 1919–20 Penn Quakers men's basketball team represented the University of Pennsylvania during the 1919–20 NCAA men's basketball season in the United States. The head coach was Lon Jourdet, coaching in his sixth season with the Quakers. The team finished the season with a 21–1 record.

Penn defeated the University of Chicago two games to zero in a best-of-three tournament at the end of the season to determine the national champion. Senior Hubert Peck was named a consensus All-American for the second time in his career (he was also selected in 1918). The team was also later retroactively named the national champion by the Helms Athletic Foundation and was retroactively listed as the top team of the season by the Premo-Porretta Power Poll.

== Schedule and results ==
Date time, TV	Rank^{#}	Opponent^{#}	Result	Record	Site city, state
Regular season
12/6/1919*		Ursinus	W 46–13	1–0	Philadelphia, PA
12/13/1919*		Muhlenberg	W 34–6	2–0	Philadelphia, PA
12/29/1919*		at Navy	W 30–17	3–0	Annapolis, MD
1/10/1920*		Lehigh	W 36–23	4–0	Philadelphia, PA
1/17/1920*		Lafayette	W 36–10	5–0	Philadelphia, PA
1/22/1920*		Washington & Jefferson	W 44–16	6–0	Philadelphia, PA
1/24/1920*		Swarthmore	W 29–25	7–0	Philadelphia, PA
1/28/1920		at Princeton; Rivalry	W 27–21	8–0 (1–0)	University Gymnasium; Princeton, NJ
1/31/1920		Yale	W 32–16	9–0 (2–0)	Philadelphia, PA
2/4/1920*		Penn State	W 21–18	10–0	Philadelphia, PA
2/12/1920		at Columbia	W 37–18	11–0 (3–0)	University Heights Gymnasium; Manhattan, NY
2/14/1920		at Dartmouth	W 41–14	12–0 (4–0)	Alumni Gym; Hanover, NH
2/18/1920*		Delaware	W 27–21	13–0	Philadelphia, PA
2/21/1920		Cornell	W 23–13	14–0 (5–0)	Philadelphia, PA
2/25/1920		Columbia	W 32–10	15–0 (6–0)	Philadelphia, PA
2/28/1920		Dartmouth	W 45–10	16–0 (7–0)	Philadelphia, PA
3/5/1920		at Cornell	W 20–15	17–0 (8–0)	Barton Hall; Ithaca, NY
3/10/1920		at Yale	W 44–16	18–0 (9–0)	New Haven, CT
3/13/1920		Princeton; Rivalry	W 26–23 ^{4OT}	19–0 (10–0)	Philadelphia, PA
3/22/1920*		at Chicago	L 24–28	19–1	Chicago, IL
3/25/1920*		Chicago	W 29–18	20–1	Philadelphia, PA
3/27/1920*		vs. Chicago; Rivalry	W 23–21	21–1	University Gymnasium; Princeton, NJ
*Non-conference game. ^{#}Rankings from AP Poll. (#) Tournament seedings in parentheses.
