= 1920 NCAA Men's Basketball All-Americans =

- Awarded for: 1919–20 NCAA men's basketball season

The 1920 College Basketball All-American team, as chosen retroactively by the Helms Athletic Foundation. The player highlighted in gold was chosen as the Helms Foundation College Basketball Player of the Year retroactively in 1944.

Player	Team
Howard Cann	New York University
Chuck Carney	Illinois
Erving Cook	Washington
Forrest DeBernardi	Westminster (Mo.)
George Gardner	Southwestern (Kan.)
Tony Hinkle	Chicago
Dan McNichol	Pennsylvania
Hubert Peck	Pennsylvania
George Sweeney	Pennsylvania
George Williams	Missouri

== See also ==
- 1919–20 NCAA men's basketball season
