= George Levis =

American basketball player and coach

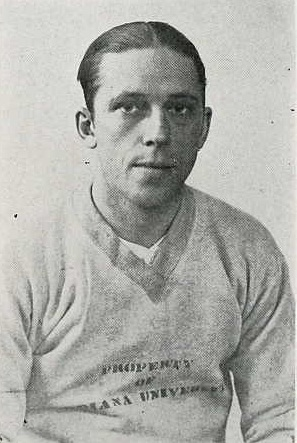
- Levis from The Arbutus 1922

Biographical details
- Born: November 22, 1894; Madison, Wisconsin, U.S.
- Died: October 8, 1980 (aged 85); Milwaukee, Wisconsin, U.S.

Playing career

Basketball
- 1912–1916: Wisconsin
- Position: Forward

Coaching career (HC unless noted)

Basketball
- 1920–1922: Indiana

Baseball
- 1921–1922: Indiana

Head coaching record
- Overall: 25–16 (basketball); 11–17 (baseball)

Accomplishments and honors

Championships
- As a player: Helms National (1916)

Awards
- As a player: 2× NCAA All-American; Helms National Player of the Year (1916); 2× First Team All-Conference

George Wynden Levis (November 22, 1894 – October 8, 1980) was an American college basketball player and coach during the 1910s and 1920s, respectively. He was a two-time All-American as a player while at Wisconsin from 1912–13 to 1915–16, and was also the Helms Foundation National Player of the Year as a senior in 1915–16. A native of Madison, Wisconsin, Levis decided to stay in his hometown for college, and while enrolled he also played on the school's baseball team.

Levis played the forward position and helped lead the Badgers to a 20–1 overall record and the Big Ten Conference championship in 1915–16, and that season would also see them retroactively declared as national champions by the Helms Foundation. Levis also led the conference in scoring as a senior: in 12 Big Ten contests he scored 109 points, which was unusual for an era of basketball in which low-scoring games were standard.

Levis was graduated from the University of Wisconsin in 1916. In 1920, Levis became the head basketball coach at Indiana. He spent two seasons guiding the Hoosiers and compiled an overall record of 25–16, including a 9–12 record in conference play. He was set to start his third season as coach in 1922–23 but resigned during the preseason in order to work at his family's glass company in Illinois. It was at Illinois Glass Company where Levis was instrumental in helping to design the glass backboard, the predecessor to the plexi-glass backboards used in basketball today.

Levis also coached baseball at Indiana University during the 1920, 1921 and 1922 seasons.

Levis was born in Madison, Wisconsin. He died on October 8, 1980, at Columbia Hospital in Milwaukee.

== Head coaching record ==
=== Basketball ===
Record table
Season	Team	Overall	Conference	Standing	Postseason
Indiana Hoosiers (Big Ten Conference) (1920–1922)
1920–21	Indiana	15–6	6–5	6th	
1921–22	Indiana	10–10	3–7	9th	
Indiana:		25–16	9–12		
Total:		25–16			
