= 1921–22 Wisconsin Badgers men's basketball team =

American college basketball season

1921–22 Wisconsin Badgers men's basketball
- Conference: Big Ten Conference
- Record: 14–5 (8–4 Big Ten)
- Head coach: Walter Meanwell
- Home arena: Red Gym

1921–22 Big Ten Conference men's basketball standings
	Conf.				Overall
Team	W		L	PCT	W		L	PCT
Purdue	8	–	1	.889	15	–	3	.833
Michigan	8	–	4	.667	15	–	4	.789
Wisconsin	8	–	4	.667	14	–	5	.737
Illinois	7	–	5	.583	14	–	5	.737
Iowa	5	–	6	.455	11	–	7	.611
Chicago	5	–	7	.417	15	–	15	.500
Ohio State	5	–	7	.417	8	–	10	.444
Minnesota	4	–	7	.364	5	–	8	.385
Indiana	3	–	7	.300	10	–	10	.500
Northwestern	3	–	9	.250	7	–	11	.389

The 1921–22 Wisconsin Badgers men's basketball team represented University of Wisconsin–Madison. The head coach was Walter Meanwell, coaching his eighth season with the Badgers. The team played their home games at the Red Gym in Madison, Wisconsin and was a member of the Big Ten Conference.

== Schedule ==
Date time, TV	Rank^{#}	Opponent^{#}	Result	Record	Site city, state
Regular Season
12/10/1921*		Michigan State	W 27–13	1–0	Red Gym; Madison, WI
12/16/1921*		Butler	L 20–26	1–1	Red Gym; Madison, WI
12/17/1921*		Ripon (WI)	W 27–17	2–1	Red Gym; Madison, WI
12/20/1921*		Knox (IL)	W 15–9	3–1	Red Gym; Madison, WI
12/22/1921*		at Milwaukee M Club	W 23–19	4–1	Milwaukee, WI
12/23/1921*		at La Crosse (WI)	W 24–21	5–1	La Crosse, WI
1/03/1922*		Nebraska	W 27–14	6–1	Red Gym; Madison, WI
1/07/1922		at Iowa	W 18–15	7–1 (1–0)	Iowa Armory; Iowa City, IA
1/09/1922		at Northwestern	W 21–9	8–1 (2–0)	Patten Gymnasium; Evanston, IL
1/14/1922		Michigan	W 18–16 ^{OT}	9–1 (3–0)	Red Gym; Madison, WI
1/21/1922		Minnesota	L 15–17	9–2 (3–1)	Red Gym; Madison, WI
2/10/1922		Illinois	W 25–23	10–2 (4–1)	Red Gym; Madison, WI
2/13/1922		Iowa	L 18–24	10–3 (4–2)	Red Gym; Madison, WI
2/18/1922		at Michigan	L 17–18	10–4 (4–3)	Waterman Gymnasium; Ann Arbor, MI
2/22/1922		Northwestern	W 23–11	11–4 (5–3)	Red Gym; Madison, WI
2/27/1922		at Illinois	L 35–37	11–5 (5–4)	Kenney Gym; Urbana, IL
3/04/1922		at Minnesota	W 34–20	12–5 (6–4)	Minnesota Armory; Minneapolis, MN
3/08/1922		Chicago	W 24–17	13–5 (7–4)	Red Gym; Madison, WI
3/11/1922		at Chicago	W 31–24	14–5 (8–4)	Bartlett Gymnasium; Chicago, IL
*Non-conference game. ^{#}Rankings from AP Poll. (#) Tournament seedings in parentheses.
