= 1919–20 Wisconsin Badgers men's basketball team =

American college basketball season

1919–20 Wisconsin Badgers men's basketball
- Conference: Big Ten Conference
- Record: 15–5 (7–5 Big Ten)
- Head coach: Guy Lowman
- Home arena: Red Gym

1919–20 Big Ten Conference men's basketball standings
	Conf.				Overall
Team	W		L	PCT	W		L	PCT
Chicago	10	–	2	.833	14	–	4	.778
Purdue	8	–	2	.800	16	–	4	.800
Illinois	8	–	4	.667	9	–	4	.692
Indiana	6	–	4	.600	13	–	8	.619
Wisconsin	7	–	5	.583	15	–	5	.750
Iowa	6	–	6	.500	9	–	10	.474
Ohio State	3	–	9	.250	17	–	10	.630
Minnesota	3	–	9	.250	7	–	9	.438
Michigan	3	–	9	.250	10	–	13	.435
Northwestern	2	–	6	.250	3	–	7	.300

The 1919–20 Wisconsin Badgers men's basketball team represented University of Wisconsin–Madison. The head coach was Guy Lowman, coaching his third season with the Badgers. The team played their home games at the Red Gym in Madison, Wisconsin and was a member of the Big Ten Conference.

== Schedule ==
Date time, TV	Rank^{#}	Opponent^{#}	Result	Record	Site city, state
Regular Season
12/05/1919*		River Falls (WI)	W 36–17	1–0	Red Gym; Madison, WI
12/13/1919*		Ripon (WI)	W 19–16 ^{OT}	2–0	Red Gym; Madison, WI
12/16/1919*		Beloit (WI)	W 33–11	3–0	Red Gym; Madison, WI
12/19/1919*		at Ripon (WI)	W 20–13	4–0	Ripon, WI
12/20/1919*		at Oshkosh (WI)	W 17–7	5–0	Oshkosh, WI
1/01/1920*		at Milwaukee	W 36–10	6–0	Milwaukee, WI
1/03/1920*		at Great Lakes (IL)	W 27–19	7–0	Drill Hall; Waukegan, IL
1/05/1920		at Iowa	W 35–18	8–0 (1–0)	Iowa Armory; Iowa City, IA
1/10/1920*		Great Lakes (IL)	W 33–15	9–0	Red Gym; Madison, WI
1/17/1920		at Chicago	L 19–36	9–1 (1–1)	Bartlett Gymnasium; Chicago, IL
1/19/1920		Iowa	L 20–21	9–2 (1–2)	Red Gym; Madison, WI
1/24/1920		at Illinois	L 20–43	9–3 (1–3)	Kenney Gym; Urbana, IL
1/31/1920		Minnesota	W 28–12	10–3 (2–3)	Red Gym; Madison, WI
2/14/1920		Michigan	W 40–13	11–3 (3–3)	Red Gym; Madison, WI
2/21/1920		Illinois	W 33–29	12–3 (4–3)	Red Gym; Madison, WI
2/24/1920		Ohio State	W 31–27	13–3 (5–3)	Red Gym; Madison, WI
2/28/1920		at Minnesota	L 26–32	13–4 (5–4)	Minnesota Armory; Minneapolis, MN
3/06/1920		at Michigan	L 19–23	13–5 (5–5)	Waterman Gymnasium; Ann Arbor, MI
3/08/1920		at Ohio State	W 34–22	14–5 (6–5)	Ohio Expo Center Coliseum; Columbus, OH
3/12/1920		Chicago	W 26–17	15–5 (7–5)	Red Gym; Madison, WI
*Non-conference game. ^{#}Rankings from AP Poll. (#) Tournament seedings in parentheses.
