= Lon Jourdet =

American basketball coach (1888–1959)

Biographical details
- Born: September 12, 1888; Frenchtown, Pennsylvania, U.S.
- Died: August 31, 1959 (aged 70); Mont Alto, Pennsylvania, U.S.

Playing career
- 1910–1912: Penn (football)
- 1910–1913: Penn (basketball)

Coaching career (HC unless noted)
- 1914–1920: Penn
- 1930–1943: Penn

Head coaching record
- Overall: 226–143 (.612)

Accomplishments and honors

Championships
- 1 Helms National (1920); 7× EIBL (1916, 1918–1920, 1934–1935, 1937)

Awards
- College football All-American (1912)

Lon Walter Jourdet (September 12, 1888 – August 31, 1959) was the head men's basketball coach for the University of Pennsylvania from 1914–1920 and then again from 1930–1943.

== Youth ==
As a student athlete at the University of Pennsylvania, Jourdet played on the football and basketball teams. He lettered in basketball from 1910–11 to 1912–13, while in football he lettered from 1910 to 1912. As a senior during the 1912 season, Jourdet was named a football All-American.

== Coaching career ==
Jourdet is credited with inventing an early version of the zone defense used in modern basketball. During his coaching career, he amassed an overall record of 226 wins and 143 losses. His 1919–20 team finished the season with a 21–1 record and was retroactively named the national champion by the Helms Athletic Foundation. In addition, this team would retroactively be listed as the top team of the season by the Premo-Porretta Power Poll.

Jourdet's win total was the highest in Penn men's basketball history until Fran Dunphy surpassed him in 2001–02, and his seven conference titles are second to Dunphy's 10. The reason for his extended absence as Penn basketball's head coach between 1920 and 1930 was summed up by The Pennsylvania Gazette in its December 3, 1920 issue, which said Jourdet "on account of a business transfer to another part of the country, has been obliged to give up coaching." He transferred to Kentucky and became engrained in both high school and college basketball there. Jourdet even officiated some of the University of Kentucky men's basketball games.

Upon returning to the Philadelphia area, Jourdet coached the Quakers for 13 more seasons and won three more Eastern Intercollegiate Basketball League championships (the conference precursor to the modern Ivy League). From 1949 to 1959, Jourdet worked in a state liquor store in Lancaster, Pennsylvania.

=== Head coaching record ===
Record table
Season	Team	Overall	Conference	Standing	Postseason
Penn Quakers (Eastern Intercollegiate Basketball League) (1914–1943)
1914–15	Penn	9–10	3–7	5th	
1915–16	Penn	11–7	8–2	T–1st	
1916–17	Penn	11–7	5–5	3rd	
1917–18	Penn	18–2	9–1	1st	
1918–19	Penn	15–1	7–1	1st	
1919–20	Penn	21–1	10–0	1st	Helms National Champions
1930–31	Penn	9–17	3–7	5th	
1931–32	Penn	10–11	2–8	5th	
1932–33	Penn	12–6	6–4	3rd	
1933–34	Penn	16–3	10–2	1st	
1934–35	Penn	16–4	10–2	1st	
1935–36	Penn	12–9	7–5	2nd	
1936–37	Penn	17–3	12–0	1st	
1937–38	Penn	8–10	7–5	T–2nd	
1938–39	Penn	7–11	6–6	T–4th	
1939–40	Penn	5–13	2–10	7th	
1940–41	Penn	5–12	3–9	7th	
1941–42	Penn	9–9	5–7	T–4th	
1942–43	Penn	14–7	6–6	T–3rd	
Total:		226–143 (.612)			
National champion Postseason invitational champion Conference regular season champion Conference regular season and conference tournament champion Division regular season champion Division regular season and conference tournament champion Conference tournament champion

== Death ==
In mid-August 1959, he was admitted to the Samuel G. Dixon Tuberculosis Hospital. On August 31, he jumped out of the third-story window of the hospital, suffering a broken neck. Jourdet was 70 years old at the time of his suicide.
