= Criticism of the Seventh-day Adventist Church =

Criticism of the Seventh-day Adventist Church includes observations made about its teachings, structure, and practices or theological disagreements from various individuals and groups.

== Major critics ==
One of the most prominent early critics of the church was D. M. Canright, an early leader of the movement in the late 19th century, who apostatized and recanted but later left and became a Baptist pastor.

In the middle of the 20th century, evangelical Walter Martin and the Christian Research Institute concluded that the Seventh-day Adventist church is a legitimate Christian body with some heterodox doctrines and stated, "They are sound on the great New Testament doctrines including grace and redemption through the vicarious offering of Jesus Christ 'once for all'." However, other scholars such as Calvinist theologian Anthony A. Hoekema, who did not agree with the Adventist view that Jacobus Arminius's theology was in line with Adventism, believed that Adventism was based on a Wesleyan/Arminian stream of theology, and grouped Seventh-day Adventism with Mormonism, Jehovah's Witnesses and Christian Science in his book The Four Major Cults.

In debates regarding the inspiration of Ellen White during the 1970s, Adventists Walter T. Rea and Ronald Numbers wrote books criticizing Ellen White and accusing her of plagiarizing vitalist authors. This revived a controversy that first emerged in the late 19th century when Conybeare and Howson sued White and her publisher for allegedly plagiarizing their 1855 book, Life and Epistles of the Apostle Paul, in preparing her own book, Sketches from the Life of Paul.

== Church doctrine ==
=== Trinitarian views ===
Some Christian critics of Adventism contend that the current Adventist view of the Trinity is unorthodox or constitutes tritheism.

Some Seventh-day Adventist scholars have acknowledged that the church's view of the Trinity differs in several aspects from the traditional Christian doctrine. According to Jerry Moon, emeritus professor at the Seventh-day Adventist Theological Seminary, Ellen White held an essentially orthodox view of the Trinity, but it differed in important respects from the medieval doctrine of the Trinity. In an 1893 (November 27th, para.5) article in Signs of the Times, White wrote, "The words of Christ were full of deep meaning as he put forth the claim [in John 10:30] that he and the Father were of one substance, possessing the same attributes".

Moon explains that early Adventist leaders criticized the doctrine of the Trinity because they rejected tradition as a source of doctrinal authority in and of itself and did not find the Trinity clearly taught in scripture. The view of the Trinity that they and White eventually came to is essentially orthodox, but it rejects "three of the philosophical presuppositions undergirding traditional trinitarianism: (a) the radical dualism of spirit and matter, which concluded that God could not have a visible form; (b) the notion of impassibility, which held that God had no passions, feelings, or emotions, hence could have no interest in, or sympathy with, humans; and (c) the dualism of time and timelessness, which led to the notions of 'eternal generation' and 'eternal procession'." In these three aspects, the Adventist understanding of the Trinity radically differs from the medieval version.

Contrarily, A. Leroy Moore contended Adventists reject the orthodox view; he argued that the proto-orthodox would probably have branded the view as Arian.

"What James [SDA co-founder James White, husband of Ellen White] and the other men were opposed to, we are just as opposed to as they were. Now, their solution to that, at that time, they didn't see any solution by retaining the Trinity concept, and getting rid of its distortions. But, in reality, we have been faithful to their commitment, and I know of nothing that they were objecting to, in objecting to Trinitarianism, that we have not also objected to." In 1876, James White discussed the differences between Seventh Day Baptists and Seventh-day Adventists, arguing, "The S. D. Adventists hold the divinity of Christ so nearly with the trinitarian, that we apprehend no trial here."

"A major development [in Adventism] since 1972 has been the quest to articulate biblical presuppositions grounding a biblical doctrine of the Trinity, clearly differentiated from the dualistic presuppositions that undergird the traditional creedal statements".

"In many ways the philosophical assumptions and presuppositions of our worldview are different from traditional Christianity and bring different perspectives on some of these old issues. We do not accept the traditional Platonic dualistic worldview and metaphysics that were foundational to the church fathers' theology of the Trinity, one of these being the concept of the immortality of the soul".

=== Christology ===
It has been alleged by the Christian Research Institute that Adventism teaches that Jesus indeed had a sinful nature. Adventists hold that Jesus of Nazareth was fully man and fully divine, and covering the nature of Jesus state that he inherited Adam's fallen nature that has been passed on to all of humanity but did not sin. The church argues that its doctrine is based on the following Christian biblical texts:

"For what the law could not do in that it was weak through the flesh, God did by sending His own Son in the likeness of sinful flesh, on account of sin: He condemned sin in the flesh" (Romans 8:3 NKJV).

"For we do not have a High Priest who cannot sympathize with our weaknesses, but was in all points tempted as we are, yet without sin" (Hebrews 4:15 NKJV).

"...concerning his Son (Jesus), who was descended from David according to the flesh" (Romans 1:3 ESV).

"Therefore, in all things He had to be made like His brethren, that He might be a merciful and faithful High Priest in things pertaining to God, to make propitiation for the sins of the people" (Hebrews 2:17 NKJV).

Adventist doctrine states that God embraced "man's nature in its fallen condition," yet "Christ did not in the least participate in its sin," portraying Jesus as having post-fall humanity while remaining sinless like Adam before the fall. Mainstream Adventists believe that Jesus was beset with all of the moral weaknesses and frailties that ordinary humans experience. However, he did not have the propensity to sin: he could be tested by temptation, but like Adam before the fall, he did not have humanity's ungodly desires or sinful inclinations. White taught that "The Lord Jesus came to our world, not to reveal what a God could do, but what a man could do, through faith in God’s power to help in every emergency. Man is, through faith, to be a partaker in the divine nature, and to overcome every temptation wherewith he is beset."

Despite this, Jesus resisted temptation from within and without and lived a perfectly obedient life. Jesus is, therefore, set forth as the supreme example in whose footsteps Christians must follow. The fact that he overcame sin completely, despite having no advantage over other human beings, demonstrates that individuals, too, can live a life of complete obedience by trusting in him. According to White, "The Lord Jesus came to our world, not to reveal what a God could do, but what a man could do, through faith in God’s power to help in every emergency. Man is, through faith, to be a partaker in the divine nature, and to overcome every temptation wherewith he is beset."

Adventists believe that salvation comes solely through faith, with works serving as proof of God's involvement in one's life.

"Notwithstanding that the sins of a guilty world were laid upon Christ, notwithstanding the humiliation of taking upon Himself our fallen nature, the voice from heaven declared Him to be the Son of the Eternal"

— Ellen White, The Desire of Ages, p. 112.

=== Investigative judgment and salvation ===
The Investigative Judgment doctrine is defined in the church's list of fundamental beliefs. In reviewing the distinctly Seventh-day Adventist doctrine, non-Adventist critics contend that it is not biblical teaching.

Adventists answer that the Investigative Judgment doctrine is not about celestial geography, that a judgment of works is compatible with the gospel, and that Scriptures like 1 Peter 4:17 and Matthew 25:31-46 NKJV teach an end-time judgment of the Church. They believe that the "end time gospel" of Revelation 14:6–12 did not sound in the first century but applies to our time. Also, many Adventist scholars interpret the references in Hebrews as to do with the inauguration of the heavenly sanctuary, taking Hebrews 6:19–20 as parallel to Hebrews 10:19–20, a view shared with certain biblical scholars of other faiths, instead of the Day of Atonement event as interpreted by critics.

The essence of Old Testament sanctuary typology that Adventists rely on for their eschatology may be summarized as follows:

The sanctuary services emphasized three aspects of Christ’s work for us: sacrifice, mediation, and judgment.

As to the 1844 date, Walter Martin wrote:

Lest anyone reading the various accounts of the rise of "Millerism" in the United States come to the conclusion that Miller and his followers were "crackpots" or "uneducated tools of Satan," the following facts should be known: The Great Advent Awakening movement that spanned the Atlantic from Europe was bolstered by a tremendous wave of contemporary biblical scholarship. Although Miller himself lacked academic theological training, actually scores of prophetic scholars in Europe and the United States had espoused Miller's views before he himself announced them. In reality, his was only one more voice proclaiming the 1843/1844 fulfilment of Daniel 8:14, or the 2300-year period allegedly dating from 457 B.C. and ending in A.D. 1843-1844.

=== Catholicism In Eschatology ===
Ellen White's writings, similar to those of the Protestant Reformers, include critical perspectives on the Catholic Church, suggesting a complex eschatological role that positions it as an antagonist to the "remnant church", represented by the Seventh-day Adventist Church. These writings reference the papacy as the beast that arises from the sea, as outlined in Revelation 13. Some of the Reformers, such as Martin Luther, John Knox, William Tyndale, held similar beliefs about the Catholic Church and the papacy when they broke away from the Catholic Church during the Reformation. Unlike some Protestant denominations, the Adventist Church opposes the ecumenical movement.

=== Soteriology ===
Seventh-Day Adventism has been attacked for allegedly holding semi-pelagian soteriological views; for example, Roger E. Olson said: "Mormons and Seventh-day Adventists have tended to promote Semi Pelagian [sic] views of salvation, although the latter have been moving more toward orthodox Protestant Christianity in the second half of the twentieth century."

== See also ==
- Criticism of Ellen G. White
