= Walter T. Rea =

Seventh-day Adventist

Walter T. Rea (June 12, 1922 – August 30, 2014) was a former Seventh-day Adventist pastor who authored the book, The White Lie (1982), an account of his research into plagiarism (literary borrowing as defined by church administrators) and uncredited sources in the writings of church co-founder Ellen G. White. His findings created turmoil in the Adventist Church regarding the inspiration and authority of White, whom the church claims possessed the spiritual gift of prophecy.

== Biography ==
Rea was born in 1922. He died in August 2014. Rea was a Seventh-day Adventist pastor in Alhambra, California in the late 1960s to early 1970s and was in Long Beach, California, when he wrote The White Lie. His church employment ended in 1980 after a newspaper article published an account of his findings.

=== Ellen G. White ===
While there had been earlier allegations of plagiarism against Ellen G. White, Rea's book, The White Lie, claimed that up to 80 or 90% of White's writings were plagiarized. Rea was the first to document the extent of this borrowing, citing 75 books White depended on. The Adventist denomination has responded to these charges in various venues. The church has continued to address related challenges in relation to understanding White's inspiration, questions on the extent of the literary borrowing and its distinction to plagiarism, and issues of integrity in the absence of illegality.

== See also ==
- Criticism of the Seventh-day Adventist Church
