= Chuck Carney =

American football and basketball player (1900–1984)

Profile
- Position: End

Personal information
- Born: August 25, 1900; Chicago, Illinois, U.S.
- Died: September 5, 1984 (aged 84); Manchester, New Hampshire, U.S.

Career information
- College: Illinois (1920–1922)

Awards and highlights
- 2× Helms Foundation All-American (1920, 1922); Helms National Player of the Year (1922); 3× First-team All-Big Ten (1920–1922); Team captain (1921, 1922); IBCA Hall of Fame (1975); Retired jersey (2008); Illinois Athletics Hall of Fame (2018)
- College Football Hall of Fame

Charles Roslyn Carney (August 25, 1900 – September 5, 1984) was an American football and basketball player.

Carney was born in Chicago in 1900. He enrolled at the University of Illinois where he excelled in both football and basketball. He played at the end position for the Fighting Illini football team from 1918 to 1921. He was selected as a consensus first-team All-American in 1920. He was elected to the College Football Hall of Fame in 1966.

Carney was a member of the Illini men's basketball team from 1920 to 1922. He established the single-season, Big Ten Conference record with 60 field goals (188 points) during the 1921 Big Ten season, a record that stood for 22 years. He was selected as an All-American basketball player in both 1920 and 1922, becoming the first Big Ten athlete to receive All-American honors in both football and basketball. He was named Helms Foundation College Basketball Player of the Year in 1922.

He is the only Fighting Illini athlete to earn consensus All-America honors in both football and basketball. He is a member of the Helms Foundation College Basketball Hall of Fame as well as the IBCA Hall of Fame. A three-time first-team all-conference selection as a basketball player, Carney is also a member of Illinois All-Century Teams for both football and basketball.

After completing his studies at the University of Illinois, Carney played one season in the APFA for the Columbus Panhandles, starting only one game. He followed his playing years by serving as an assistant football coach for several years. He held posts as the ends coach for the Northwestern Wildcats, Wisconsin Badgers, and Harvard Crimson. He later worked as a New York Stock Exchange representative for the investment banking and financial services firm of Dominick & Dominick.

== Honors ==
=== Basketball ===
- 1922 – Helms National Player of the Year
- 1920, 1922 – First Team All-American
- 1920, 1921, 1922 – First-team All-Big Ten
- 1975 – Inducted into the Illinois Basketball Coaches Association's Hall of Fame as a player.
- 2004 – Elected to the "Illini Men's Basketball All-Century Team".
- September 13, 2008 – Honored jersey which hangs in the State Farm Center to show regard for being the most decorated basketball players in the University of Illinois' history.
- September 22, 2018 – Inducted into the Illinois Athletics Hall of Fame

=== Football ===
- 1920 – Consensus All-American
- 1966 – College Football Hall of Fame
- November 2, 1990 – Elected to Illinois Football All-Century Team

== Statistics ==
=== Basketball ===
Season	Games	Points	PPG	Big Ten Record	Overall Record	Highlight
1919–20	13	206	15.8	8–4	9–4	First Team All-American
1920–21	8	38	4.75	7–5	11–7	Pre-Season Injury
1921–22	19	258	13.6	7–5	14–5	Player of the Year
Totals	40	502	12.6	22–14	34–16	

=== Football ===
Season	Position	Big Ten Record	Overall Record	Highlight
1918	End, Punter	4–0	5–2	Big Ten co-champion
1919	End, Punter	6–1	6–1	Big Ten & National Champions
1920	End, Punter	4–2	5–2	Consensus All-American
1921	End, Punter	1–4	3–4	-
Totals	End, Punter	15–7	19–9	
