= Arthur Karpus =

American athlete (1898–1983)

Arthur Joe Karpus
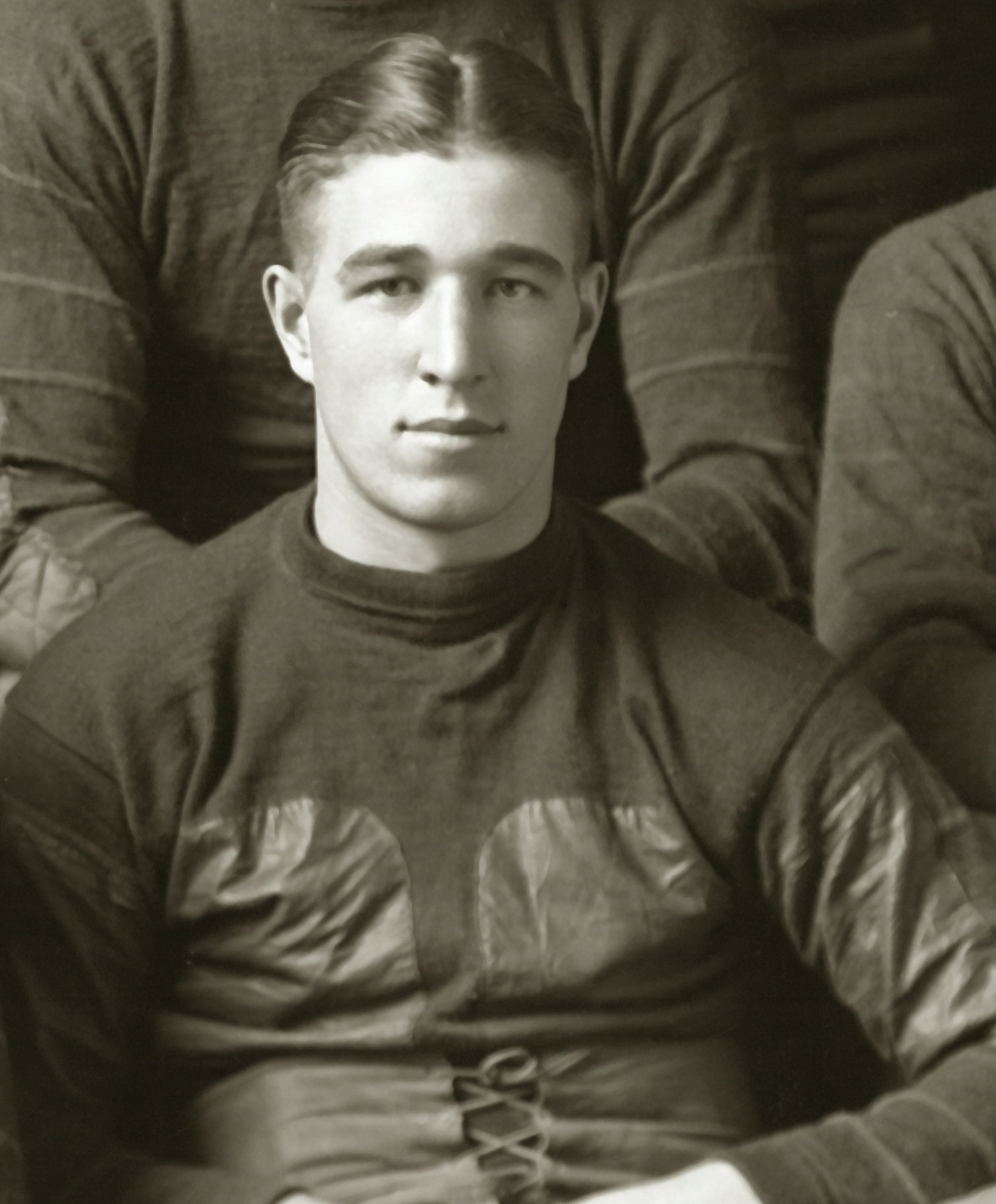
- Karpus from 1918 football team portrait

Personal information
- Born: January 16, 1898; Michigan
- Died: March 15, 1983 (aged 85); Bay City, Michigan

Career information
- College: Michigan

Arthur Joe Karpus (January 16, 1898 – March 15, 1983) was an American football, basketball and baseball player. He attended the University of Michigan from 1917 to 1923, winning a total of seven varsity letters, three in basketball, three in baseball and one in football. He played for Big Ten Conference championship teams in football (1918), baseball (1919) and basketball (1921). He was captain of the 1920–21 Michigan Wolverines men's basketball team that won the school's first conference championship in basketball. He was Michigan's leading scorer in basketball during both his junior and senior seasons. Karpus later played three years of minor league baseball from 1921 to 1923. After graduating from Michigan, Karpus worked as a mechanical engineer. He was employed by the Michigan State Highway Commission from approximately 1937 until his retirement in 1967.

== Early life ==
Karpus was born in 1898 and raised in Bay City and Grayling, Michigan. His father, Stephen Karpus, emigrated to the United States in 1889 and worked as a sawmill hand in Bay City. His mother, Helen (Kitze) Karpus was also an immigrant. In 1900, Karpus was living in Bay City with his parents and three older sisters.

== University of Michigan ==
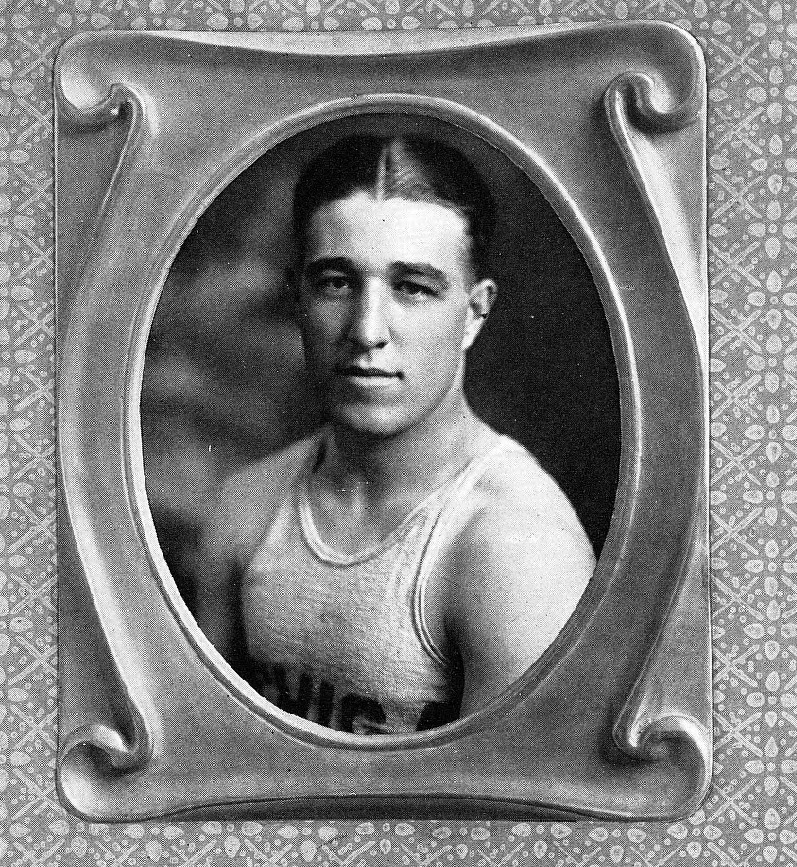
Portrait of Karpus as captain of Michigan's 1921 basketball team.

Karpus enrolled at the University of Michigan where he played for the football, basketball and baseball teams. As a freshman in 1917, he played at the end position for Michigan's all-freshman football team.

As a sophomore during the 1918–19 academic year, Karpus lettered in football, basketball, and baseball. He played at the end and halfback positions for the undefeated 1918 Michigan Wolverines football team that won the Big Ten Conference and national championships. He also played center for the 1919 basketball team. In February 1919, he made a basket in the second overtime period to give Michigan a 19–17 win over Michigan Agricultural College (now Michigan State). He also scored 13 of Michigan's points in a 38–20 win over Ohio State later that same month. He also played third base for the undefeated 1919 baseball team that won the Big Ten Conference championship.

As a junior during the 1919–20 academic year, Karpus was academically ineligible to play football in the fall. However, he again lettered in basketball and baseball. Playing at the forward position, he played in eight games, scoring 22 baskets from the floor and 31 free throws for a total of 75 points. At the end of the 1920 basketball season, Karpus was elected captain of the 1921 basketball team.

As a senior during the 1920–21 academic year, Karpus was once again declared academically ineligible in the fall. However, his eligibility was restored in December, allowing him to participate in most of the basketball season. Despite missing several games, Karpus, playing at the forward position, was the team's high scorer for the second straight year, and he led the team from a last place finish the prior year to a three-way tie for the Big Ten Conference basketball championship. The 1921 basketball team compiled a record of 16–4 and won both games against Michigan Agricultural for the first time in the history of the rivalry. In a summary of the 1921 basketball season, the University of Michigan yearbook praised Karpus' contributions:

In any consideration of the players on the 1921 Varsity, Captain Joe Karpus leads, because of his high scoring ability, and the spirit which he put into the team. Karpus was the leading scorer of the team, both this year and last. He also ranked high in the Conference. It was his foul shooting that pulled more than one game out of the fire, during 1921. His performance in the first Illinois game, when he threw nine fouls out of a possible eleven will stand out as one of the most brilliant individual records of the season. Karpus coupled to his basket shooting ability an uncanny knack at dribbling.

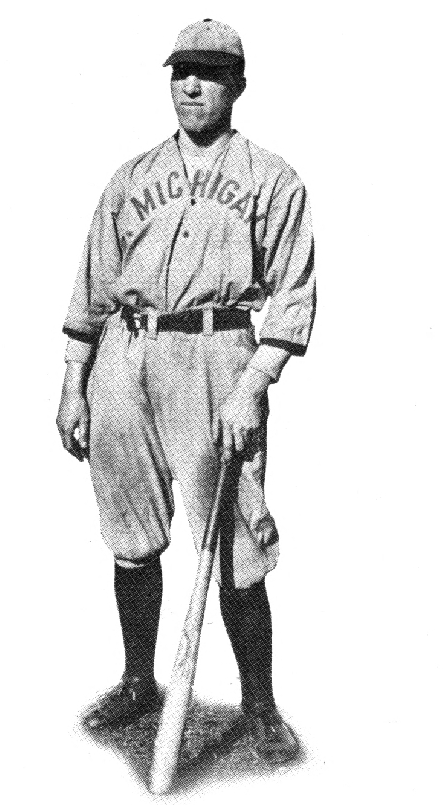
Karpus in baseball uniform.

Karpus also played third base for the 1921 baseball team. The 1921 Michiganensian noted of Karpus: "When a hit was needed in a pinch, Coach Fisher could usually count on Joe who handled third base in a remarkable fashion. It was Karpus' third year on the Varsity."

== Minor league baseball ==
After graduating from Michigan, Karpus played minor league baseball in the Michigan–Ontario League for the Bay City Wolves in 1921, the Saginaw Aces in 1922 and the Kalamazoo Celery Pickers in 1923. He maintained a .326 batting average and a .439 slugging percentage in 37 games for the 1921 Bay City team.

== Later life ==
At the time of the 1930 Census, Karpus was living in Detroit, Michigan with his wife, Angeline "Angela" (Superzynski) Karpus. He listed his occupation at the time as mechanical engineer at a copper and brass manufacturer. From approximately 1937 to 1967, Karpus was employed by the Michigan State Highway Commission in Lansing, Michigan, the last 20 years as the Commissions's equipment manager. He retired in 1967.

Karpus died in 1983 at Bay City, Michigan.
