= Walter B. Rea =

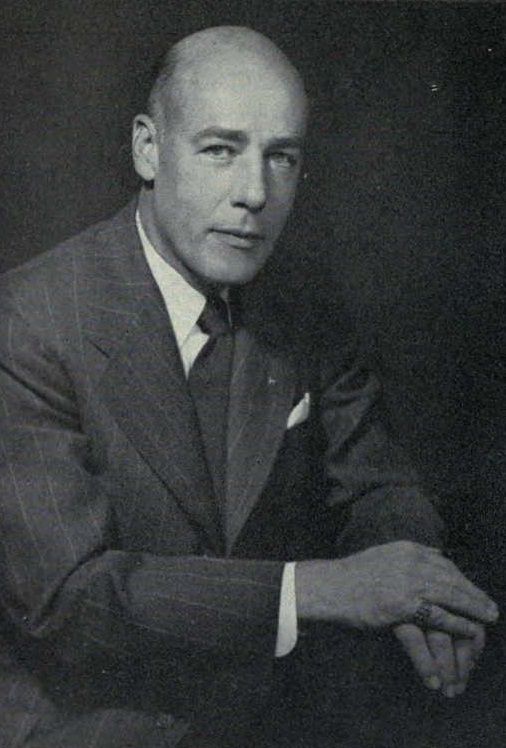
- Rea from the 1949 Michiganensian

Personal information
- Born: September 9, 1898 Pennsylvania
- Died: August 1970 (aged 71) Ann Arbor, Michigan

Career information
- College: Michigan

Walter Burnette "Bud" Rea (September 9, 1898 – August 1970) was an American university administrator and basketball player. He served variously as the assistant dean of students, dean of men, and dean of students at the University of Michigan from 1930 until 1962. He also served as the chairman of the committee on university scholarships and director of financial aid. As a student at the University of Michigan, he was a member of the basketball team. He was the leading scorer on the 1919–20 Michigan Wolverines men's basketball team and the captain of the 1921-22 team.

== Early years ==
Rea was born in Pennsylvania in 1898. He grew up in Erie, Pennsylvania, where his father, Charles J. P. Rea, was employed as a printer.

== Student athlete ==
Rea attended the University of Michigan. He was the president of the literary department's Class of 1922. While attending Michigan, Rea was also active in athletics. He was a member of the Michigan basketball and track teams for three straight years. As a sophomore, he was the leading scorer on the 1919–20 Michigan Wolverines men's basketball team. As a senior, he was the captain of the 1921–22 Michigan Wolverines men's basketball team that finished with a 15–4 record—the best record achieved by a Michigan basketball team up to that time. He was also a member of the Phi Gamma Delta fraternity, Michigamua, and the Sphinx, and the chairman of the University Service Committee. In January 1922, he authored an article that was published in The Michigan Chimes urging the student body to support the basketball team as they had long done for the football team.

== University administrator ==
After receiving his degree in 1922, he spent most of his adult life working as an administrator at the University of Michigan. He served as the assistant dean of students, the dean of men, and the dean of students from 1930 until 1962. He was also the manager of the University of Michigan Marching Band during the 1940s. In the 1950s, he also served as the university's spokesperson on a variety of issues, including a 1950 student demonstration against a decision to forbid Communists from speaking on campus, a 1956 student riot in protest of poor food quality, a 1956 Look magazine article claiming that the university had violated conference rules by providing scholarships to student-athletes who failed to maintain a C average, a 1958 investigation into a football card gambling racket being operated by students, a campus craze in the 1950s in which large numbers of male students conducted "panty raids" in women's dormitories, a ban on driving by students, a 1959 controversy over a Chinese student living for four years in the attic of an Ann Arbor church, the Yost Honor Awards for combined athletic-scholastic achievement, and student disciplinary matters. He also served as the chairman of the committee on university scholarships. During the 1960s, he served as the university's director of financial sid.

Rea died in 1970 at age 71 in Ann Arbor.
