= Waterman Gymnasium =

Gymnasium in Ann Arbor, Michigan

Coordinates: 42.278157°N 83.736330°W

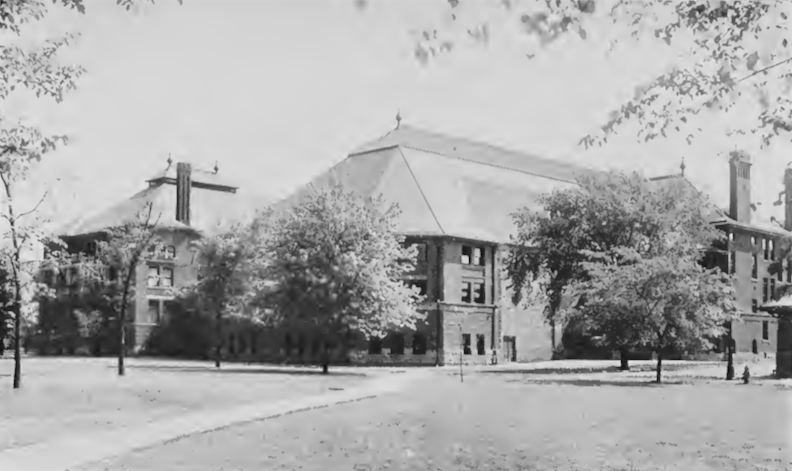
- c. 1920
- Interactive map of Waterman Gymnasium
- Location: 930 N University Ave; Ann Arbor, MI 48109
- Owner: University of Michigan
- Operator: University of Michigan
- Surface: Hardwood

Construction
- Opened: 1893
- Renovated: 1898 (Barbour Gymnasium addition), 1916
- Closed: 1946
- Demolished: 1977
- Cost: $42,705 ($1.53 million in 2025 dollars) $25,000 ($967,500 in 2025 dollars)

Tenant
- Michigan Wolverines men's basketball (1908-1924)

The Waterman Gymnasium was the first on-campus gymnasium at the University of Michigan in Ann Arbor, Michigan. The building was the first home of the Michigan Wolverines men's basketball team. The building stood at the corner of North University Avenue and East University Avenue, at the northeast corner of the original campus.

== History ==
By 1878, an effort began to build a gymnasium for sporting events on campus. Fundraising took several years, but the first major donation of $20,000 ($716,667 in 2025 dollars) came from Joshua W. Waterman of Detroit in 1891. In all, $48,800 ($1.82 million in 2025 dollars) was raised for the building of both a men's and women's gymnasium; however, due to the Panic of 1893, this was not enough to build the women's gymnasium. In 1893 the men's gymnasium, named for Waterman, was opened, with the excess funds being used to equip the gymnasium.

In 1895, University Regent Levi L. Barbour gave the university several lots in Detroit to be used for an art building. At the January, 1898 regent's meeting, it was decided to sell the lots and use the profits of $25,000 ($967,500 in 2025 dollars) to build a women's gymnasium. The Barbour Gymnasium addition was completed that year to the north of the original Waterman Gymnasium and was intended for use by women students. The two buildings were connected by several doors that could be opened for larger events, such as University Senate receptions and dances.

By the 1910s, however, both buildings were proving inadequate. In 1916, Waterman Gymnasium was expanded to its east and west ends, making the building 248 feet long, with a 1/10 mile long elevated running track on the second level. Even this renovation, however, was not enough to meet the needs of the rapidly growing University. In 1924, Fielding H. Yost Field House opened to the east of Ferry Field, with the basketball team moving to it that season. With the Intramural Athletic Building opening north of the field in 1928, Waterman and Barbour both ceased to be used as the primary site of athletics on the campus. The Angell Auditorium in Barbour was used for dance classes (having been condemned for use as an auditorium a few years earlier), and several offices took up residence in the buildings. Barbour was torn down in 1946, with Waterman being torn down in 1977. The Williard Henry Dow Laboratory building was built on the site as an addition to the neighboring Chemistry Building.
