= Bonnet House =

Historic house in Florida, United States

- U.S. National Register of Historic Places
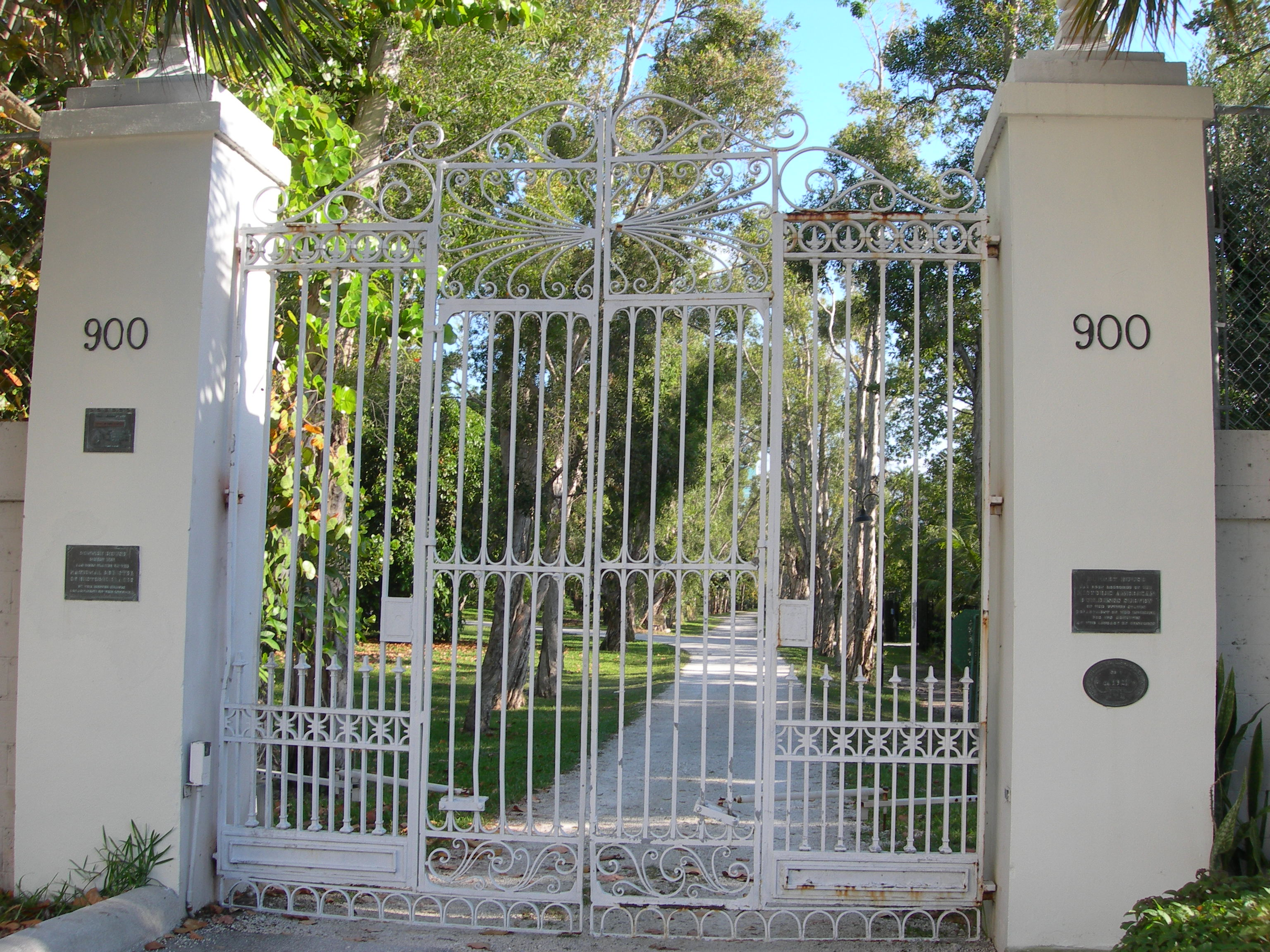
- Gate to Bonnet House grounds

- Location within Florida Location within the United States
- Interactive map showing the location of Bonnet House
- Location: Fort Lauderdale, Florida
- Coordinates: 26°8′7″N 80°6′20″W
- Website: bonnethouse.org
- NRHP reference No.: 84000832
- Added to NRHP: 5 July 1984

The Bonnet House (also known as the Bartlett Estate) is a historic home in Fort Lauderdale, Florida, United States. It is located at 900 Birch Road. On July 5, 1984, it was added to the U.S. National Register of Historic Places. It is named after the Bonnet Lily.

== History ==
The property was originally acquired in 1895 by Hugh Taylor Birch, a Chicago lawyer, and given to his daughter Helen and her husband, artist Frederic Clay Bartlett, as a wedding gift in 1919. Bartlett built a plantation-style home on the property and wintered there with his wife and child from a previous marriage, Frederic Jr, until Helen died in 1925. As a memorial to his late wife Bartlett donated his extensive art collection to the Art Institute of Chicago. Bartlett was a self-taught architect; the main house is based on his interpretation of Caribbean plantation-style architecture. Bartlett then married Evelyn Fortune Lilly, ex-wife of Eli Lilly, and they continued to use the home as a winter residence until his death in 1953 and hers in 1997. She deeded the property in 1983 to the Florida Trust for Historic Preservation, which maintains the property as a historic house museum called the Bonnet House Museum & Gardens. The estate was valued at $35 million, the largest single private donation in state history. In 1988 Jon Nordheimer of The New York Times described it as "an unrivaled time capsule neatly preserved from an era earlier in the century when the wealthy elite could afford a cozy 35-acre winter hideaway in Florida."

== Layout ==
The principal buildings include the main house, an art studio, a music studio and a guest house. They are all of vernacular architecture, designed by Bartlett. The estate is 35.4 acres (14.3 ha). It includes 100 feet (30 m) of beach. In April 2015, Bonnet House officials completed five years of negotiations with the city of Fort Lauderdale to designate the 700-foot (210 m) stretch of beachfront property in front of it private so that it can host wedding receptions and other private events there without having to get special permits from the city. There are five different ecosystems within the property: primary and secondary dunes, mangrove wetlands, a fresh water slough and a maritime forest.

=== Art studio ===
The first building completed was the art studio.

=== Main house ===
The ceiling of the drawing room in the main house is of mahogany from a large log that washed ashore in a storm. A motif of pairs throughout the house reflects an interest of Frederic and Evelyn Bartlett.

== Modern times ==
In 1987, 6,000 visitors took the 90-minute tour of the site.

Evelyn Bartlett had a pet monkey and bought 30 to 40 monkeys to live in the trees of the estate. When a local bar, LeClub, that featured monkeys closed they fled to the Bonnet House. In 2014 at least three of them still lived there.

Bartlett's sister Maie Bartlett Heard founded the Heard Museum in Phoenix with her husband Dwight B. Heard.

Since 2003, the Bonnet House has sought to increase revenue by serving as a filming location. It was the Finish Line for the seventh season of the hit CBS reality show The Amazing Race. It also was a filming location for the movie Hoot.

In May 2008, the National Trust for Historic Preservation listed the building on its list of America's Most Endangered Places. The same year, the Bonnet House settled a lawsuit against a developer planning an 18-storey hotel nearby. The settlement included almost half a million dollars for landscaping to obscure the view of the new building. The proposed hotel had been controversial, many people both in favor and opposed spoke at public hearings on the subject. Also in 2008 it was featured in the book, Great Houses of Florida.

In 2012, the Bonnet House joined the Riverwalk Arts and Entertainment District as a cultural partner. In 2017, Patrick Shavloske was named chief executive officer.

Bonnet House
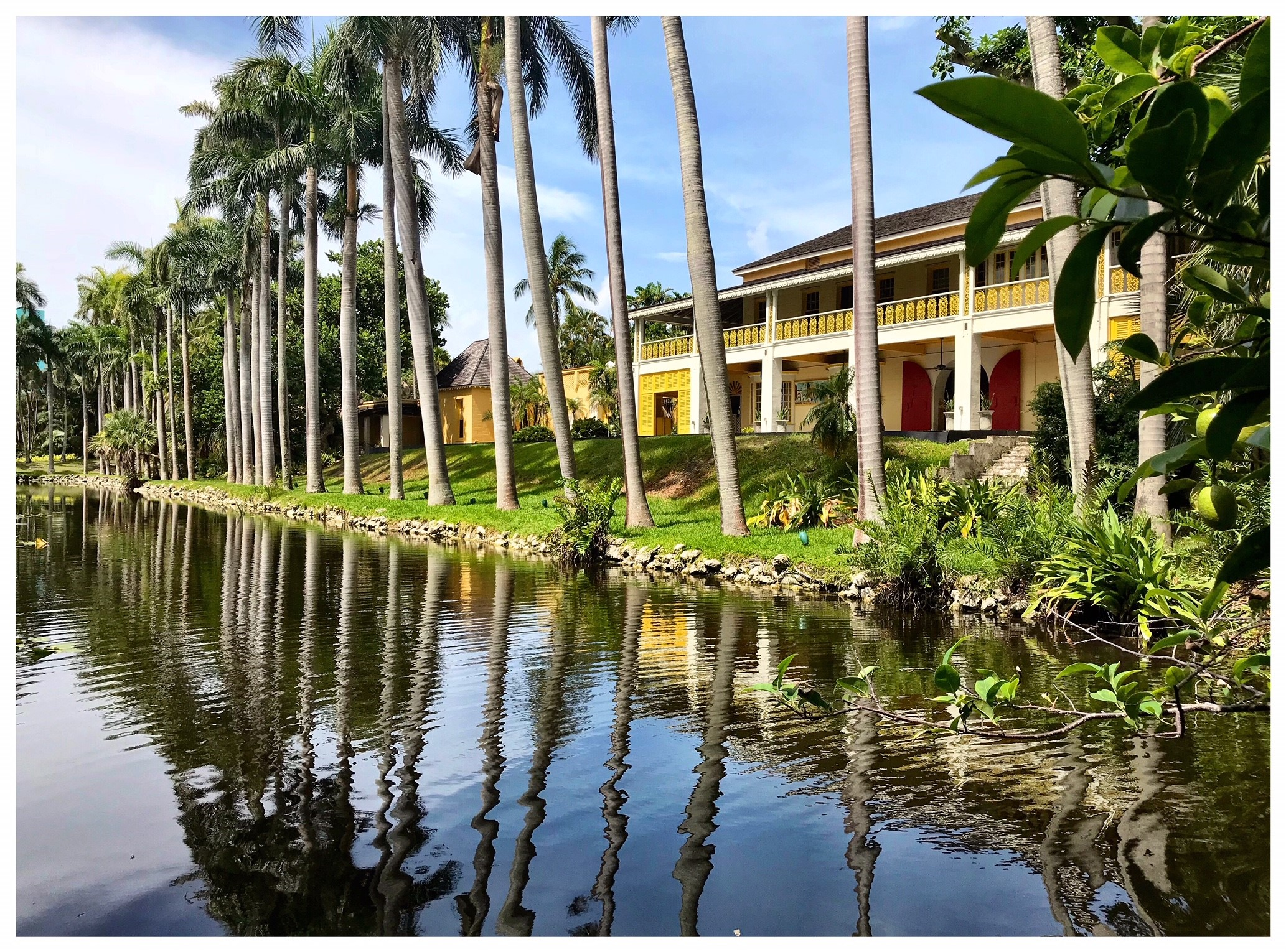

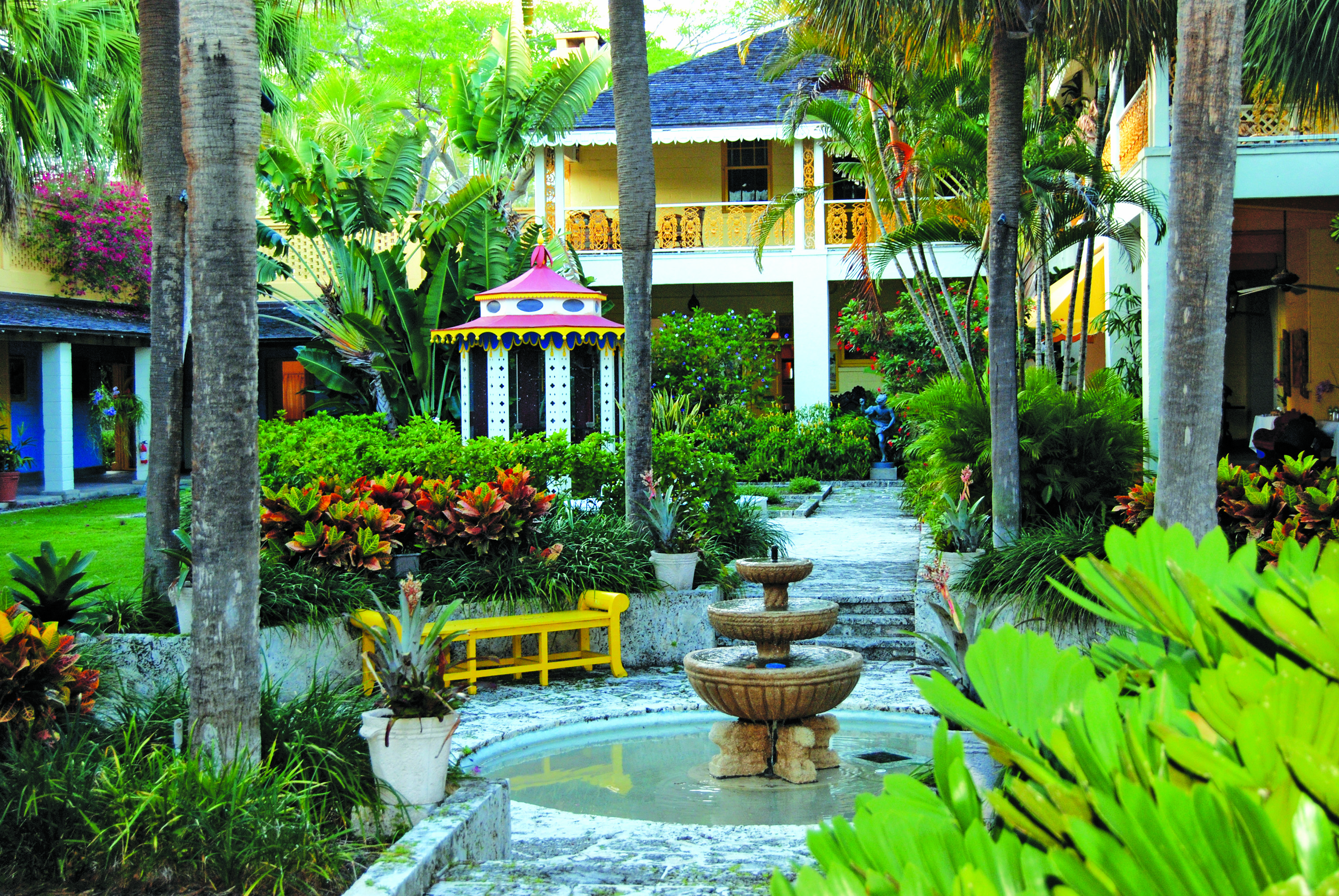

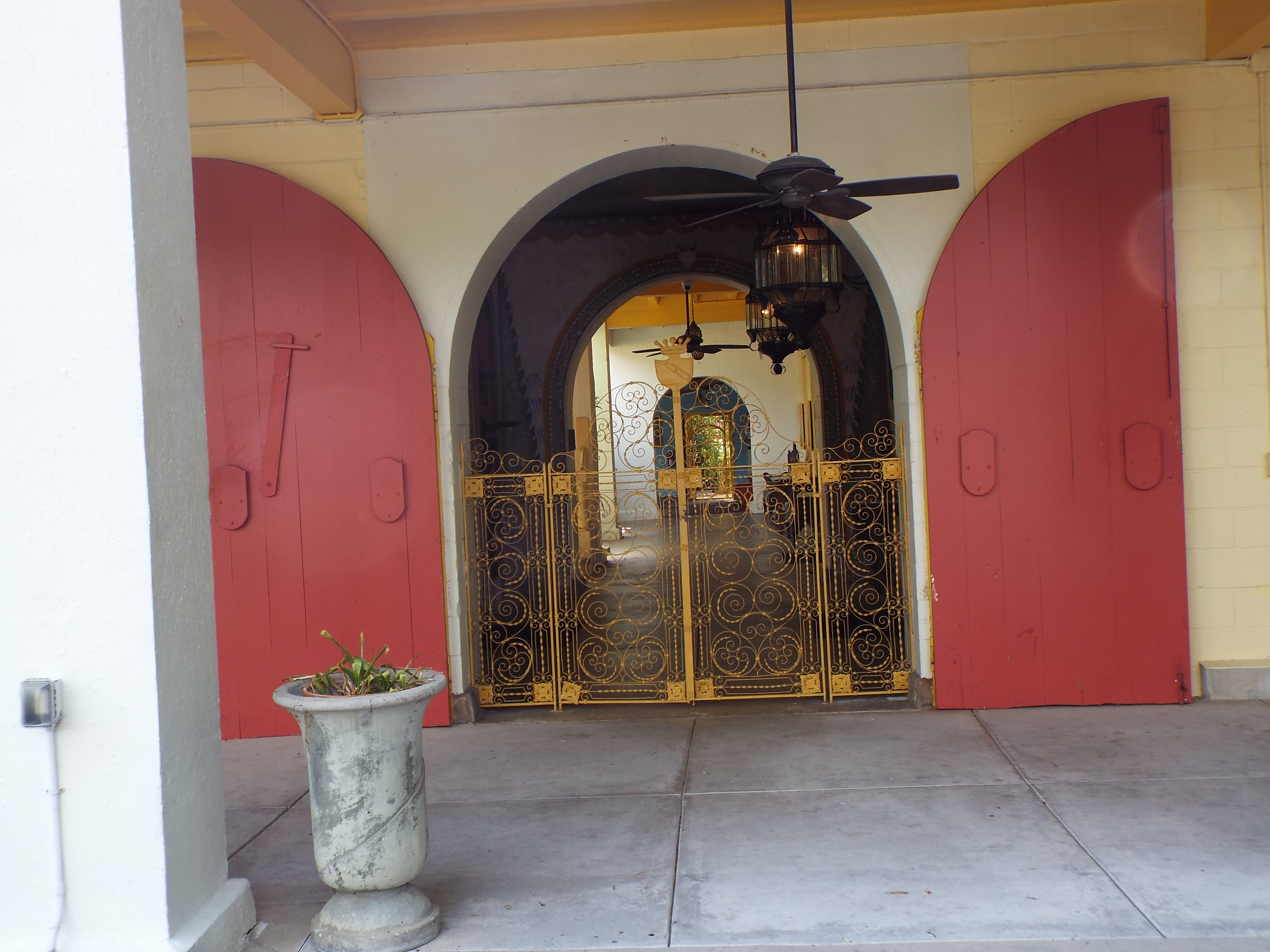
Entrance of the Bonnet House

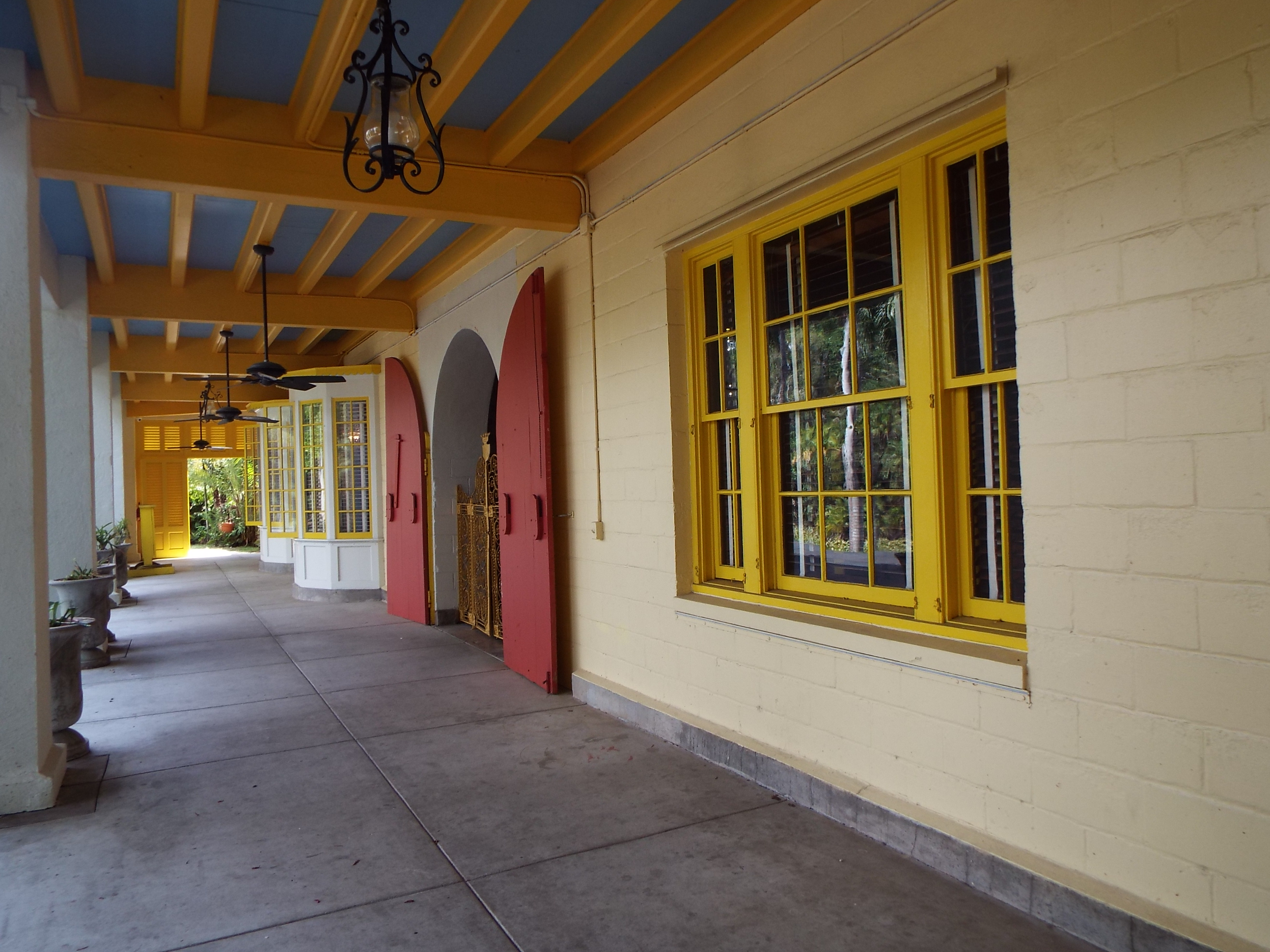
Different view of the front of the house

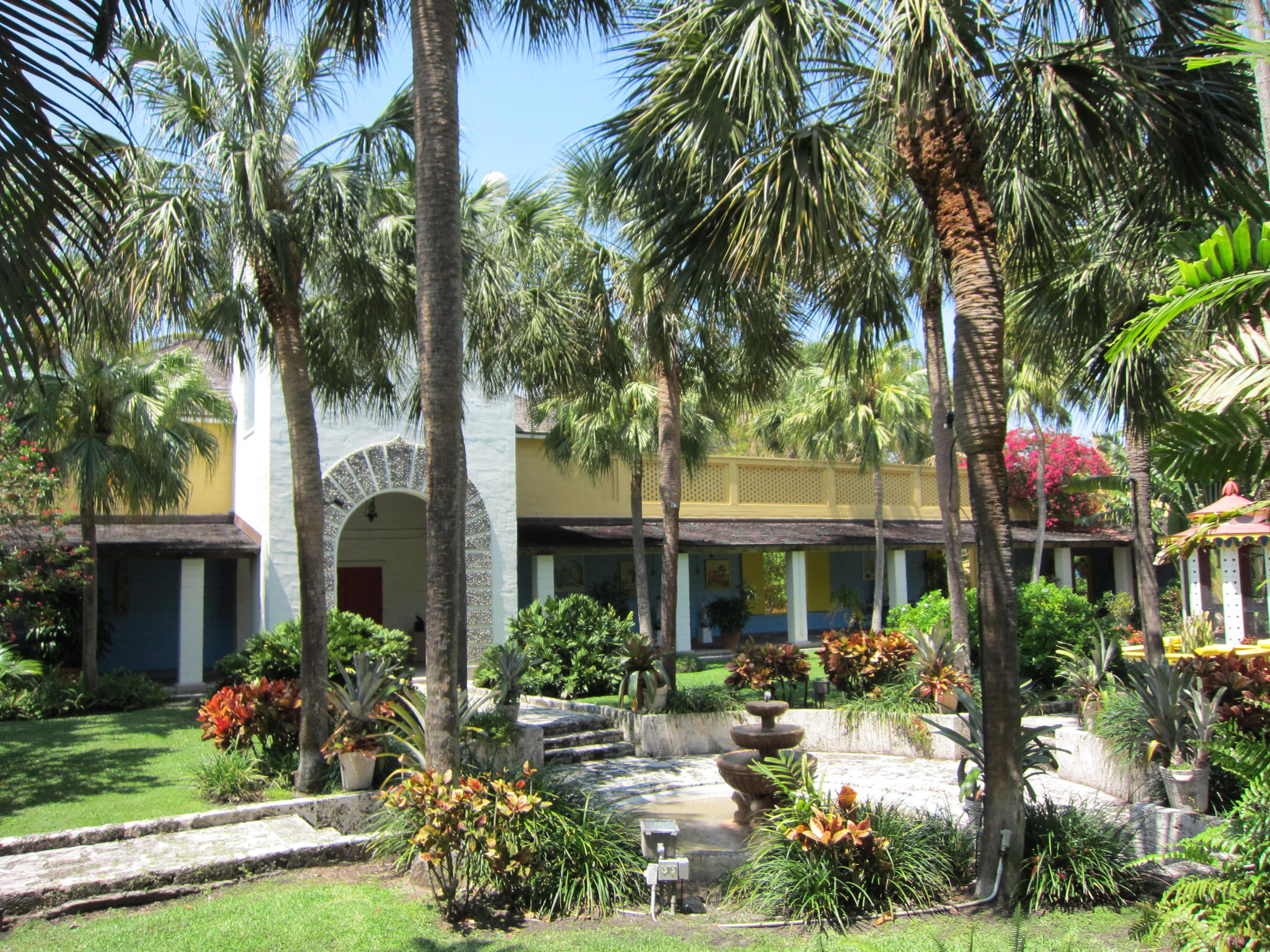
Inside the main house of the estate

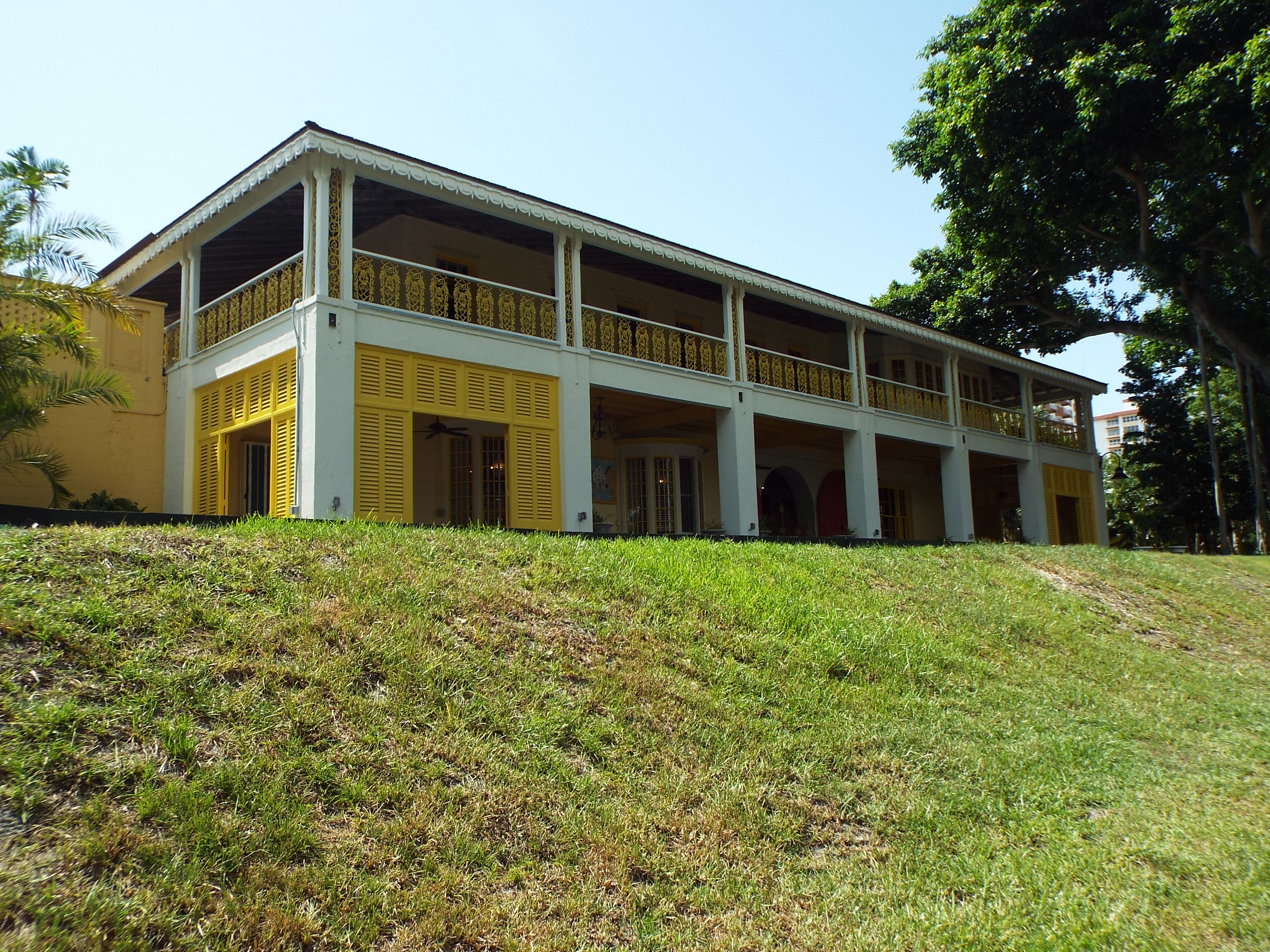
View from a different angle of the Bonnet House

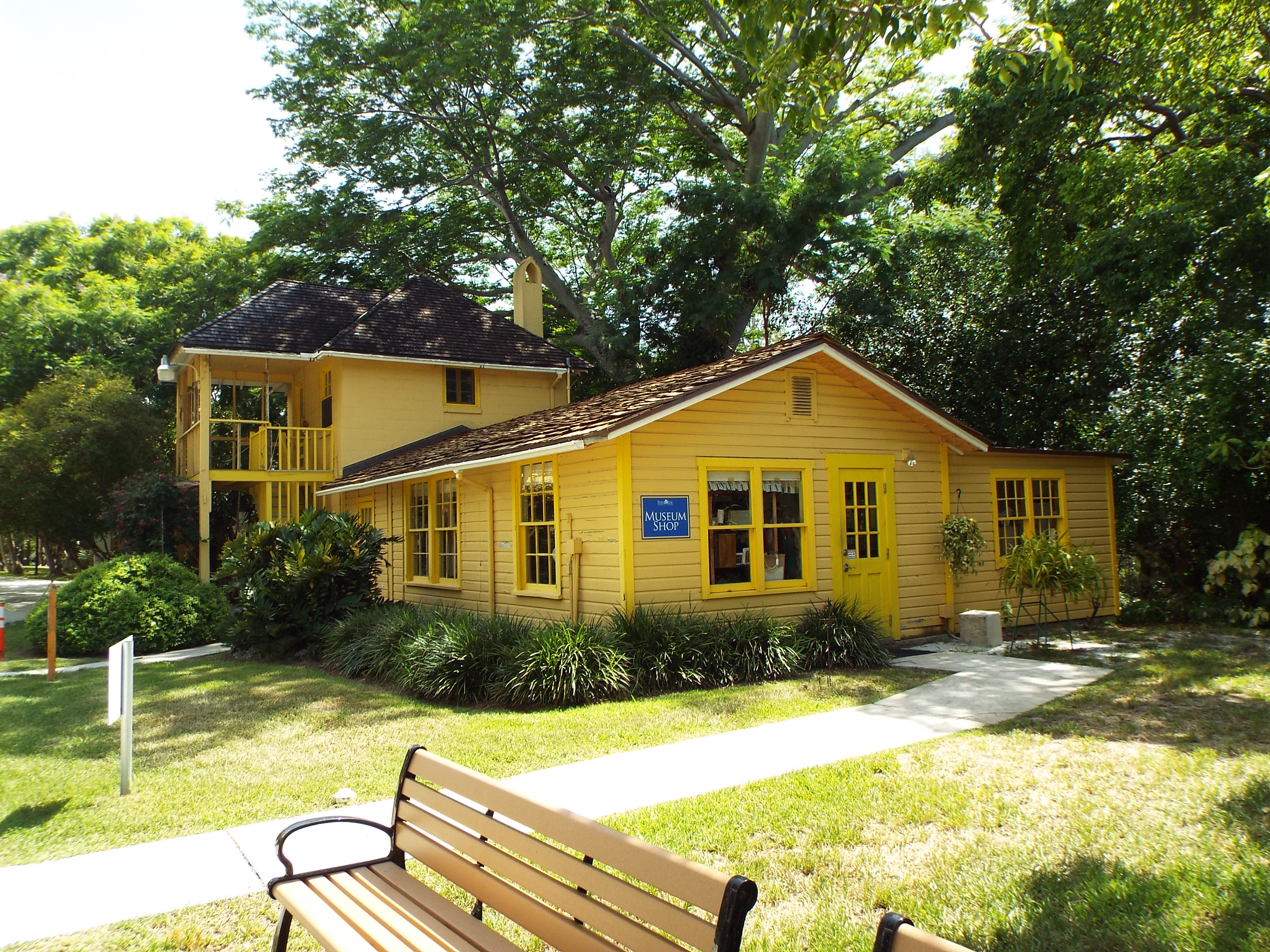
Some of the buildings located within the grounds of the Bartlett Estate

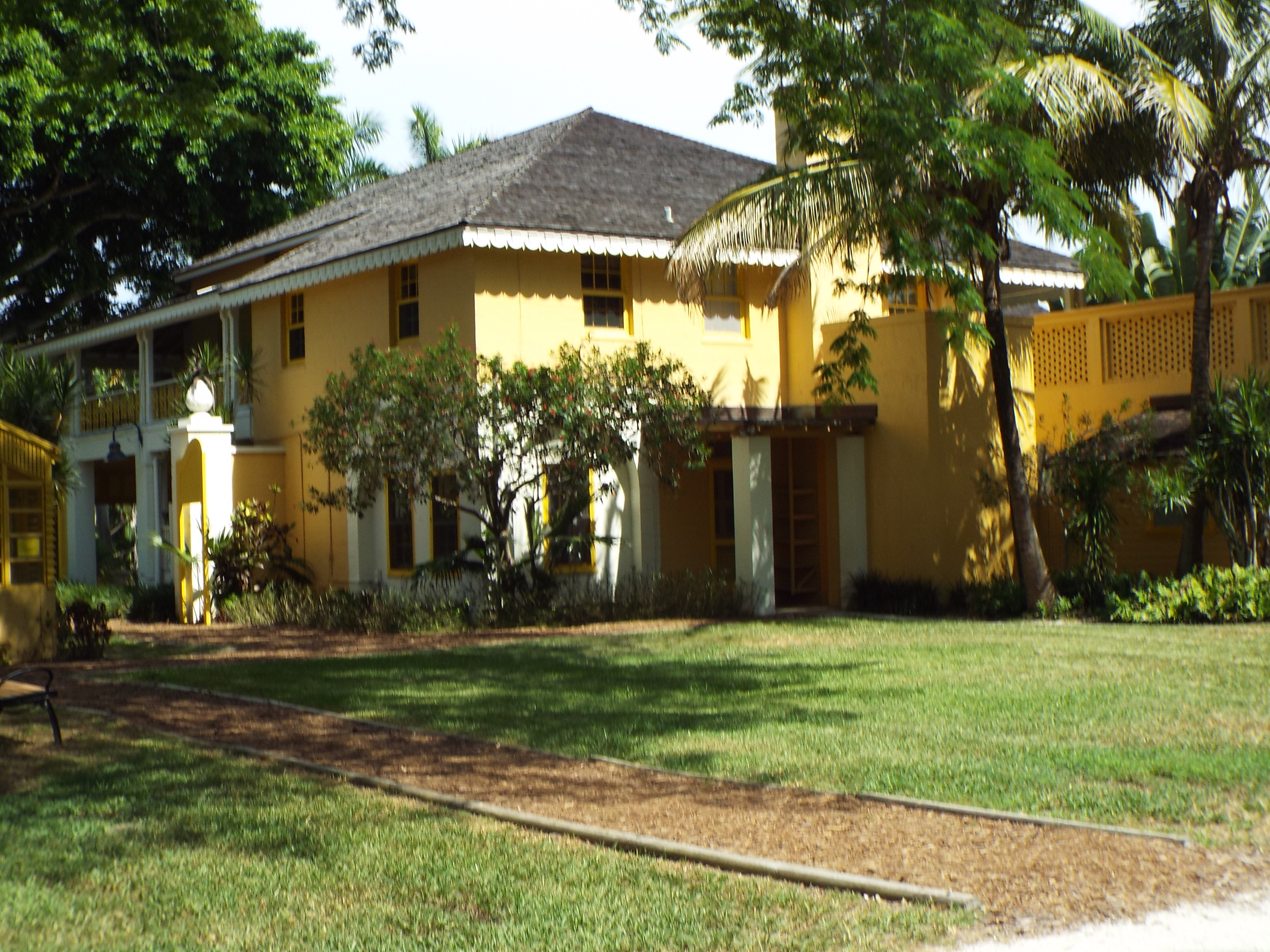
More buildings in the grounds of the Bartlett Estate

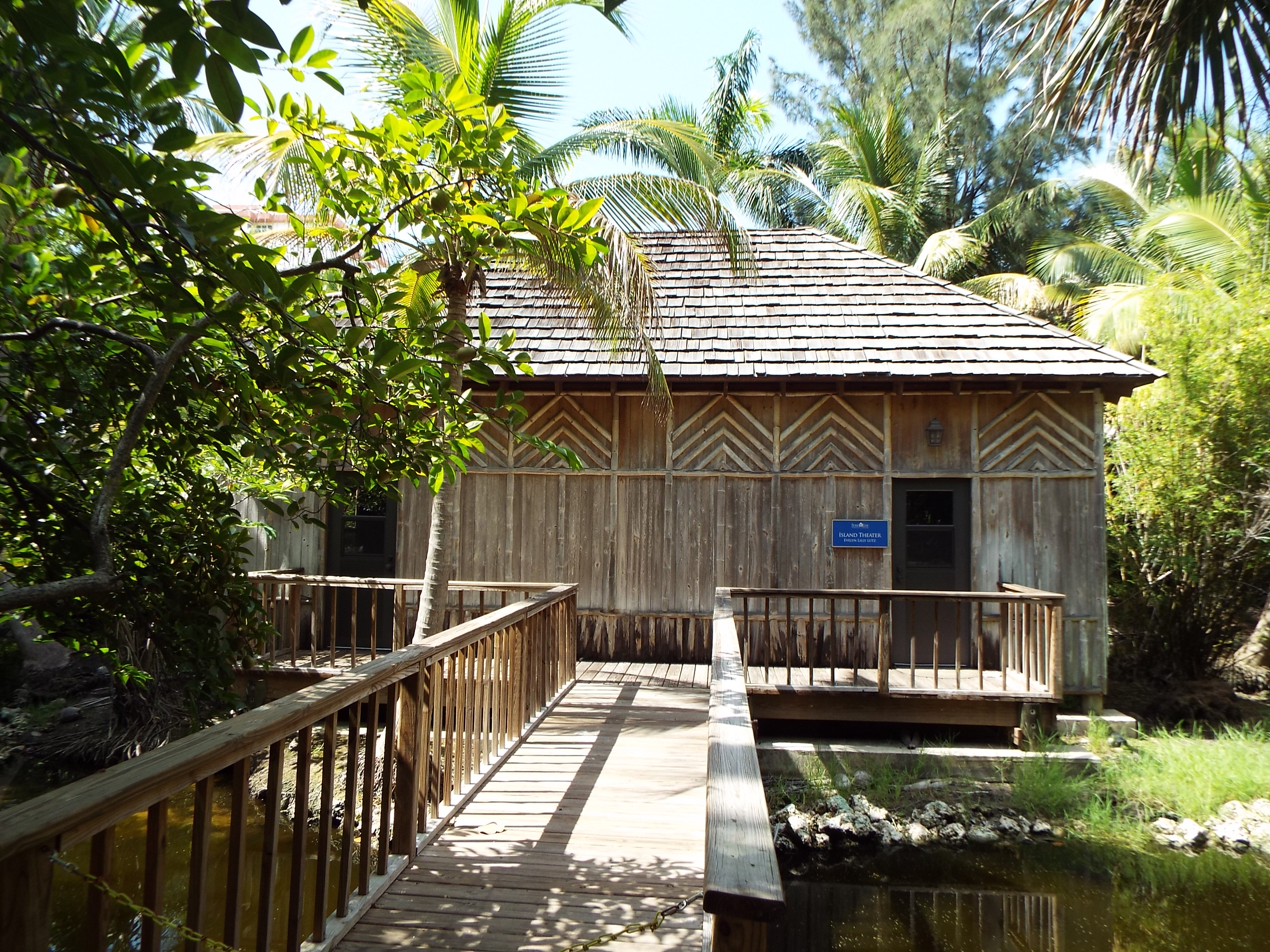
Fort Lauderdale's first theater, the "Island Theater", located in the grounds of the Bartlett Estate.
