= Frederic Clay Bartlett =

American artist and art collector (1873–1953)

Frederic C. Bartlett
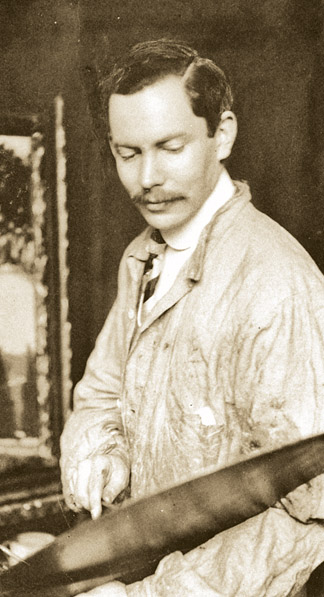
- Frederic Clay Bartlett at his easel, 1906
- Born: June 1, 1873; Chicago, Illinois, U.S.
- Died: June 25, 1953 (aged 80); Beverly, Massachusetts, U.S.
- Resting place: Graceland Cemetery
- Occupations: Artist, Art collector
- Known for: Art collection
- Spouses: Dora Tripp (m. 1898; died 1917) Helen Louise Birch (m. 1919; died 1925) Evelyn Fortune Lilly (m. 1931)
- Children: Frederic Clay Bartlett Jr.
- Parent(s): Adolphus C. Bartlett; Mary Pitkin Bartlett
- Relatives: Maie Bartlett Heard(sister); Frank Dickinson Bartlett(brother); Florence Dibell Bartlett(sister); Eleanor Collamore Bartlett(sister)

Frederic Clay Bartlett (June 1, 1873 – June 25, 1953) was an American artist and art collector known for his collection of French Post-Impressionist and modernist art. Bartlett was committed to promoting the work of fellow contemporary artists and was a founding member of the Arts Club of Chicago, a pioneering organization dedicated to the advancement of modern art.

== Early life ==
Bartlett was born in Chicago to Mary Pitkin Bartlett and Adolphus Clay Bartlett, the president of Hibbard Spencer Bartlett & Company, the company that originated the label True Value. He attended St. Paul's in Concord, New Hampshire, and the Harvard School for Boys in Chicago. However, at the age of nineteen, instead of pursuing a college degree, Bartlett traveled to Europe from Chicago to study art

Bartlett attributed the World's Columbian Exposition of 1893 as his main source of inspiration regarding fine art. In 1894, Bartlett, along with fellow Chicagoan, Robert Allerton, would be admitted to the Royal Academy in Munich, an honor that very few Americans would earn. It was during his time in Germany that Bartlett would meet Dora Tripp from White Plains, New York, the woman that would eventually become his wife. In 1896, after completing their studies in Munich, Allerton and Bartlett would study under masters Aman-Jean and Collin during their enrollment at Ecole Collin. They would study drawing under Collin and Painting under Aman-Jean for two years while in Paris. Allerton and Bartlett enjoyed a romantic friendship that had begun in childhood and ended only when Bartlett married.

== Marriages ==
=== Dora Tripp ===
On October 4, 1898, Bartlett and Tripp would get married in upstate New York and spend the next year in Paris, studying under American painter James Abbott McNeill Whistler's Académie Carmen. After Whistler's school closed, Bartlett enhanced his painting prowess by studying mural art with the direction of French master, Puvis de Chavannes. The following year, Bartlett and his wife would return to Munich to complete his art education.

In 1900, at the age of twenty-seven, Bartlett moved to Chicago where he rented a studio in the Fine Arts Building on Michigan Avenue. It was here that he received his first commissioned piece of art, a portrait that he was paid $75 upon its completion. An active and successful painter, Bartlett was committed to promoting the work of fellow contemporary artists, beginning in 1905, as a member of the Art Institute's Art Committee, and later, in 1916, as a founding member of the Arts Club of Chicago, a pioneering organization dedicated to the advancement of modern art.

==== Dorfred House ====
In 1902, the Bartletts moved into their new home at 2901 Prairie Avenue, Chicago. This home, designed by Frost & Granger, would be named "Dorfred House", a combination of the names Dora and Fred. Constructed just two blocks away from his boyhood home on historic Prairie Avenue, the home boasted a studio measuring forty feet by twenty-five feet with a twenty foot high ceiling. Beyond the studio, the home offered a reception room known as the Pompeian Room, an Italian music room and library on the first floor with the kitchen, a Louis XVI dining room, laundry and servants rooms in the basement along with the upstairs private chambers, including bedrooms and powder rooms.

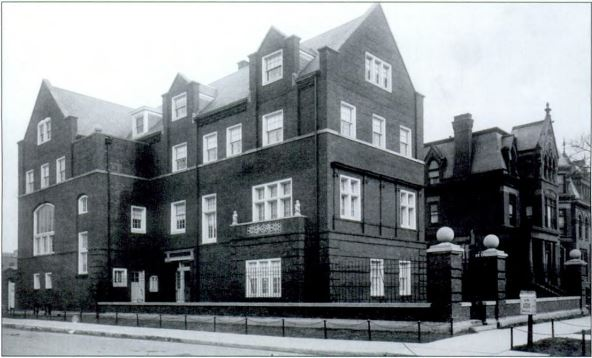
The Prairie Avenue home of Frederic Clay Bartlett 2901 Prairie Avenue, Chicago, Illinois

==== Works of art ====
During his marriage to Dora, Bartlett was more active with his creativity regarding art, especially the creation of murals. In 1900, he was commissioned to create a mural for the Second Presbyterian Church in Chicago. After a fire destroyed the church, Bartlett and his friend, Howard Van Doren Shaw, integrated frescoes depicting the Tree of Life and a Heavenly Choir painted in the Byzantine manner. Bartlett followed this mural with a more personal endeavor in 1904. He completed a frieze in stained-glass depicting a medieval tournament procession for the Frank Dickinson Bartlett Memorial Gymnasium on the campus of the University of Chicago. The gym was a memorial to Bartlett's younger brother, Frank, who died of an appendicitis in 1900. Bartlett's father, Adolphus funded the construction of the facility while being a trustee for the university. In 1909 Barlett completed a series of individual paintings that covered over fifty ceiling panels of the Michigan Room in the University Club of Chicago. Soon after he painted a series of murals—which were destroyed in a fire in 1957—for the Chicago City Council chambers in the new City Hall-County Building.

On March 3, 1917, Bartlett's wife, Dora, died after nineteen years of marriage. Prior to Dora's death, Bartlett's son, Frederic Clay Bartlett Jr., was born on November 20, 1907. Bartlett Jr., who would be known as "Clay", would grow-up and become a talented artist and musician, however; he would unfortunately die at the age of forty-eight in 1955, only two years after the death of his father. Through his son Bartlett Jr., Frederic Clay Bartlett became the great grandfather of the TV actress, Ali Wentworth.

=== Helen Louise Birch ===
On January 22, 1919, Bartlett would marry his second wife, Helen Louise Birch, a close friend of Dora. Birch, born February 27, 1883, was thirty-six years old, compared to her husband who was forty-five. Prior to her marriage, Helen Birch was both a published composer and poet. She studied music with the German expatriate Bernhard Ziehn, a music theorist and teacher of harmony and composition in Chicago. She was an avid supporter of the Chicago Symphony Orchestra and the Chicago-based Poetry magazine. Helen Birch was the daughter of Maria Root Birch and Hugh Taylor Birch. After the Great Chicago Fire, Hugh Birch became a named partner in the law firm of Galt, Birch and Galt. In 1872, he would become the first State's Attorney of Cook County, Illinois and eventually move to the area that currently is Fort Lauderdale, Florida. Helen's maternal great uncle, Frank Spencer, ran the hardware company, Hibbard, Spencer & Bartlett in which Frederic's father became a partner in 1882.

==== Bonnet House ====
Between May 1, 1893, and March 1920, Hugh Birch and Helen Birch Bartlett purchased hundreds of acres of Floridian land that would eventually become Hugh Taylor Birch State Park as well as the Bonnet House. Construction of the Bonnet House, a plantation-style home, began in 1920 on land that was given to the Bartletts as a wedding gift from her father. Currently on the National Register of Historic Places, the Bonnet House was intended to be the location for the Bartlett family to spend their winters. However, due to their constant travels in Europe, the family would spend summer days in Lake Geneva while maintaining their apartment in Manhattan near Columbus Circle.

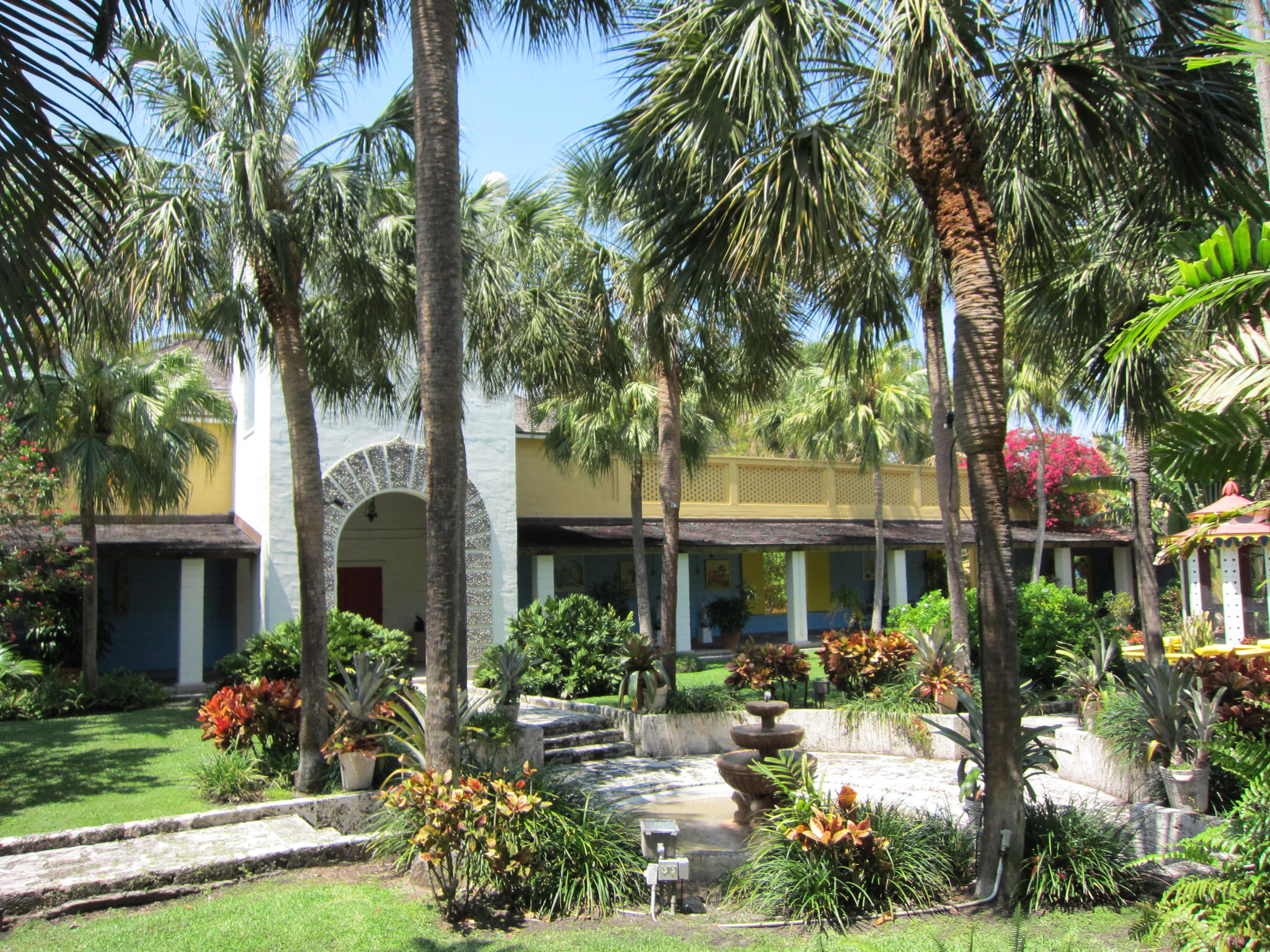
Bonnet House, Fort Lauderdale, Florida

==== Art inspiration ====
Helen Birch and Frederic Bartlett were married in Boston at a private ceremony attended only by Senator Albert Beveridge and his wife Catherine Eddy Beveridge and Mrs. Marshall Field Sr., the former Delia Spencer, both cousins of Birch. For their honeymoon, the couple traveled throughout Asia, traveling to Japan, China and the Philippines. It was during this trip that Bartlett would be inspired to create twenty-one paintings that would be exhibited in the Art Institute's American Exhibitions of 1919 and 1920, as well as in his one-man exhibition at the Montross Gallery in New York City in 1921.

==== Collections ====
The Bartletts were a dynamic couple. From like upbringings, they had similar interests and played off each other's strengths. They were fixtures of Chicago's civic-minded elite during the early 1900s. Prior to their marriage, Frederic's art collection focused on a variety of sources, including antique, Renaissance, and 19th-century fine and decorative arts. In the early 1920s, their collecting activities became more focused. Leading a cosmopolitan lifestyle, the couple traveled regularly to Europe, where they acquired a collection of modern art. Concentrating on the contemporary French avant-garde, they purchased works by André Derain, André Dunoyer de Segonzac, André Lhôte, and Amedeo Modigliani. In the spring of 1923, they acquired Henri Matisse's, Woman Before an Aquarium. The following year, less than one year after Frederic succeeded his father as a trustee of the Art Institute, they acquired Georges Seurat's, Sunday Afternoon on the Island of La Grande Jatte. This purchase was made specifically with the museum in mind, at a time when the artist was not yet represented in any American or French public collection. Over the next several years, with the intention of placing La Grande Jatte in an appropriate artistic context, the Bartletts purchased major paintings by key Post-Impressionist artists Paul Cézanne, Paul Gauguin, Vincent van Gogh, and Henri de Toulouse-Lautrec, as well as important works by other modern masters, such as Pablo Picasso and Henri Rousseau.

==== Memorial collection ====
After only six-and-one-half years of marriage, Helen Birch Bartlett died of cancer on October 24, 1925. To honor his wife, Frederic presented their unique art collection to the Art Institute of Chicago in May 1926. A portion of the Helen Birch Bartlett Memorial Collection has been permanently displayed in the museum continuously since the donation. During the 1920s and 30's, Bartlett would swap-out paintings in order to add pieces that would be a better representation or example of the work or artists displayed. The twenty-five paintings in the collection are still in the possession of the Art Institute as well as other works from the same historical time-frame.

==== Private collection ====
In addition to the paintings in the Helen Birch Bartlett Memorial Collection, the Bartletts' private collection contained paintings by other modern European artists, among them Vlaminck, Dufy, Herbin, Foujita, de la Fresnaye, Valadon, Marcoussis, Severini, and Pascin, which were not part of the final donation to the Art Institute. Still others were by artists whose names are no longer easily recognized, such as Lotiron, Beaudin, Waroquier, Pruna, and Marmorek. Among the few Americans represented in the collection were John Mann and Charles Demuth, whose watercolors The Brook and Flowers, respectively, the Bartletts acquired in 1924. (While the present whereabouts of most of these works is not known, the aforementioned watercolors are in the Art Institute.) The Bartletts' lack of interest in collecting modern American art occurred despite the fact that Frederic was a founding member of the Art Institute's Friends of American Art, established in 1910 as the first organization in any museum to purchase current work by American artists for the collection. This group, which lasted into the 1940s, provided the Art Institute with the substance of its collection of twentieth-century American painting and sculpture but it tended to overlook the work of the American avant-garde.

=== Evelyn Fortune Lilly ===
Bartlett married Evelyn Fortune Lilly (1887–1997) of Indianapolis, Indiana, in June 1931. Following Helen Bartlett's death, the one-time acquaintances reunited in Beverly, Massachusetts. Bartlett was 58 years old; Lilly was 44. Evelyn Fortune was the oldest daughter of May (Knubbe) and William Fortune. Her father was president of a group of independent telephone companies that included the Indianapolis Telephone Company; a member of the board of directors of the pharmaceutical firm Eli Lilly and Company from 1919 to 1927; a founder of the Indianapolis chapter of the American Red Cross in 1916; and served as the first president of the Indianapolis Chamber of Commerce.

Evelyn married her high school sweetheart, Eli Lilly Jr. (1885–1977), on August 29, 1907. Evelyn Fortune's father and Eli Lilly's grandfather, Colonel Eli Lilly, and father, Josiah K. Lilly Sr., were one-time friends. The Lillys had two sons, one born in 1908 and the other in 1910, both of whom died in infancy. Their only surviving child was a daughter, Evelyn "Evie" (Lilly) Lutz (1918–70). Eli and Evelyn Lilly divorced in 1926.

==== Artwork ====
During his marriage to Evelyn, Frederic Bartlett's eyesight began to fail based on cataracts he had contracted. This affected his ability to paint, however; it heightened Evelyn's desire to create works of art. The couple gave up their Chicago apartment on Astor Street and their studio in the Fine Arts Building and moved to Massachusetts while wintering at the Bonnet House in Florida. They opened a studio in Munich, Germany and, with her husband's encouragement, Evelyn took up painting. She moved quickly from watercolors to oils and developed her own style. Her interests included vividly colored portraits, still lifes and flower paintings. Her creations bore little resemblance to her husband's murals, landscapes and figurative works, executed in muted tones.

==== Memorial collection addition ====
In 1932, Toulouse-Lautrec's "Ballet Dancers" was the final addition to the Helen Birch Bartlett Memorial Collection as well as the last painting acquired by Frederic Bartlett. Bartlett would continue to gift institutions with artwork, although none was comparable to the collection given to the Art Institute of Chicago. In 1942, Bartlett presented the Indianapolis Museum of Art with a bust of Senator Beveridge created by Paul Manship. The Museum of Modern Art was given Amedeo Modigliani's Bride and Groom. These would be the final museum gifts Bartlett would produce.

== Later life, death, legacy ==
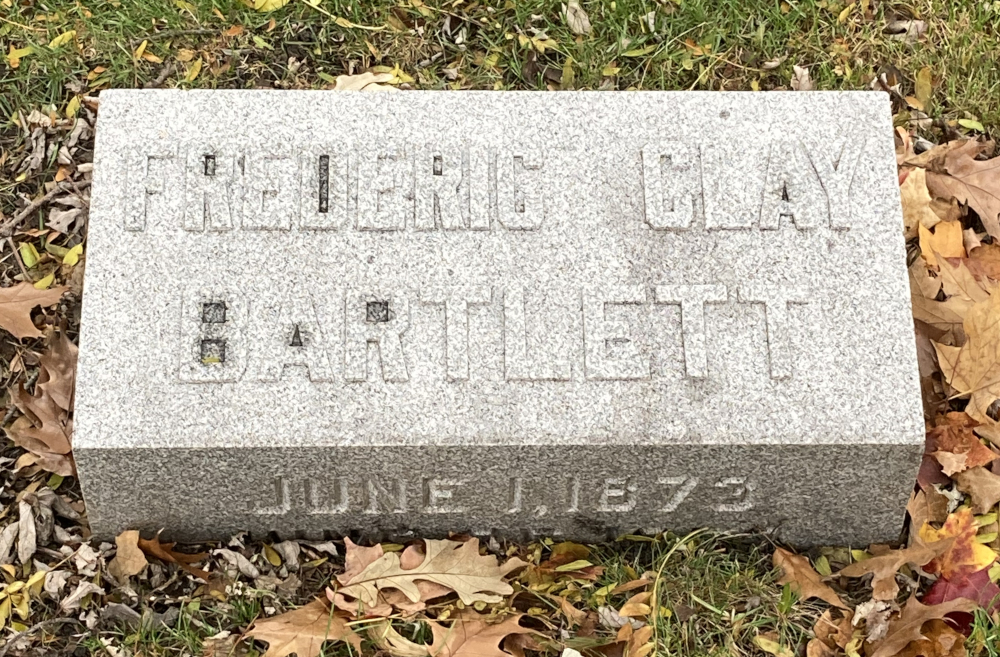
Bartlett's grave at Graceland Cemetery

In the last decade of his life, Bartlett focused his attention to the beautification of his Florida estate. He suffered a partially disabling stroke in 1949 and four years later on June 25, 1953, he died due to complications from his stroke. He was buried at Graceland Cemetery in Chicago.

In May 1954, the Art Institute staged a memorial exhibition comprising nearly twenty of his paintings. In subsequent years, Evelyn Bartlett would donate many paintings and sculptures to the Art Institute. Her interest in Chicago's art scene continued even after her husband's death. In 1982, the Smithsonian Institution organized a retrospective exhibition of the Bartletts' work that also traveled to the Art Institute.
