= Adolphus C. Bartlett =

American businessman (1844–1922)

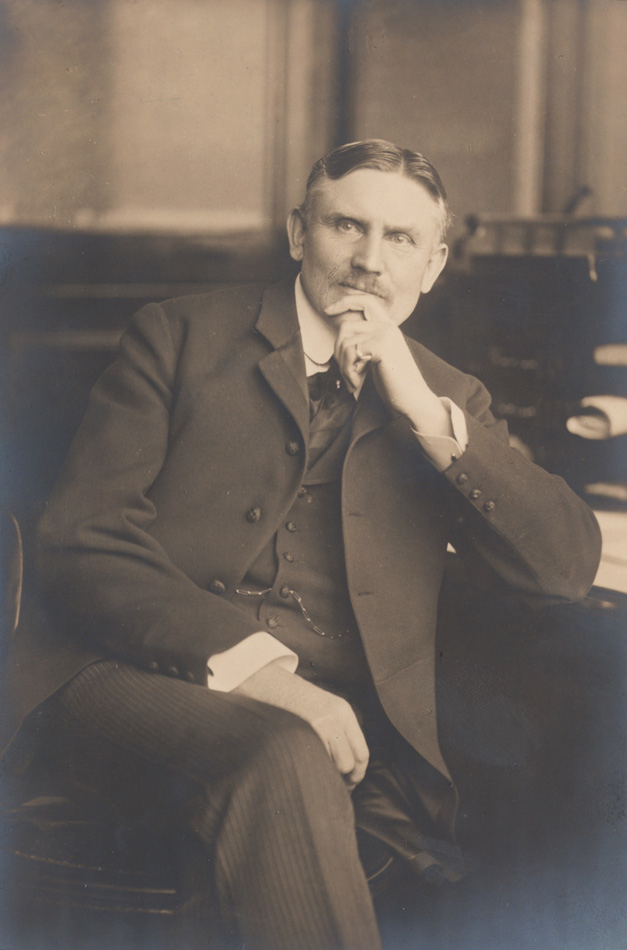
- Bartlett c. 1900
- Born: June 22, 1844; Stratford, New York, U.S.
- Died: June 1, 1922 (aged 77); Pasadena, California, U.S.
- Resting place: Oak Woods Cemetery
- Occupations: Business magnate, philanthropist
- Spouses: Mary Pitkin (m. 1867; died 1890) Abbey Hitchcock (m. 1893)
- Children: Maie Bartlett Heard (b.June 11, 1868); Frederic Clay Bartlett (b.June 1, 1873); Frank Dickinson Bartlett (b.1880); Florence Dibell Bartlett (b.1881); Eleanor Collamore Bartlett (b. July 17, 1894)

Adolphus Clay Bartlett (June 22, 1844 – June 1, 1922) was an American industrialist, the president of Hibbard Spencer Bartlett & Company, the company that originated the label True Value.

Bartlett was a pioneer hardware merchant and business leader in Chicago. Besides being the president of Hibbard, Spencer, Bartlett & Company, he was an important donor to the Art Institute of Chicago, the Chicago Historical Society and the University of Chicago. He served on several powerful boards in the city and contributed to the original Parliament of the World's Religions, which was an attempt to create a global dialogue of faiths. Bartlett was a director of the First National Bank, Liverpool and London and Globe Insurance Company, a member of the Chicago Board of Education, trustee of Beloit College, University of Chicago, president of the Home for the Friendless, vice-president of the Old People's Home, and a director of the Art Institute.

== Early life ==
Bartlett was born in Stratford, New York in 1844 to parents Aaron Bartlett and Delia Dibeli Bartlett. When he was ten years old his father died and his mother relocated to Salisbury Center, New York where he attended school until he was sixteen years old. He completed his education by attending Danville Institute for one year and Clinton Liberal Institute for an additional two. After finishing school, Bartlett worked one winter as a school teacher and one summer as a clerk in a country store.

== Chicago ==
=== Hibbard, Spencer, Bartlett & Co. ===
In 1863, at the age of nineteen, Bartlett moved to Chicago and took the position of office boy for Tuttle, Hibbard & Company, a wholesale hardware business. After earning a meager wage while working tenaciously for three years, he worked his way into a profit sharing, management position within the company. Bartlett was known for working more hours than any other employee, arriving first and leaving last each day. He also developed an organized sales force and handled every order that the company received, keeping a meticulous record in a ledger complete with all correspondence with buyers. By 1869, after six years of working within the company, Bartlett was made general partner.

During his time as partner, the Great Chicago Fire occurred, nearly destroying the city as well as the company. However, due to the high demand for hardware during the rebuilding of the city, the business, ironically, prospered. It was Bartlett's persuasive letter writing style which convinced suppliers to maintain their relationship with the company during the reconstruction. After fully recovering, the company continued to grow and in 1877 began to offer profit sharing to all members of the firm, increasing its overall value.

In 1882, the business incorporated under the name of Hibbard, Spencer, Bartlett & Company and Bartlett was made secretary of the company. Following the death of Franklin Fayette Spencer in 1890, Bartlett was named vice-president. On January 1, 1904, after the death of William Gold Hibbard, Bartlett was named president of the company. Under his leadership the company saw the completion of a new, fireproof, headquarters next to the State Street Bridge.

In 1914, after 50 years in the company, at the age of 70, Bartlett became the chairman of the board of directors. By taking on this role within the company, Bartlett achieved the ultimate "rags to riches" scenario, from sweeping floors to managing a worldwide corporation.

=== Personal life ===
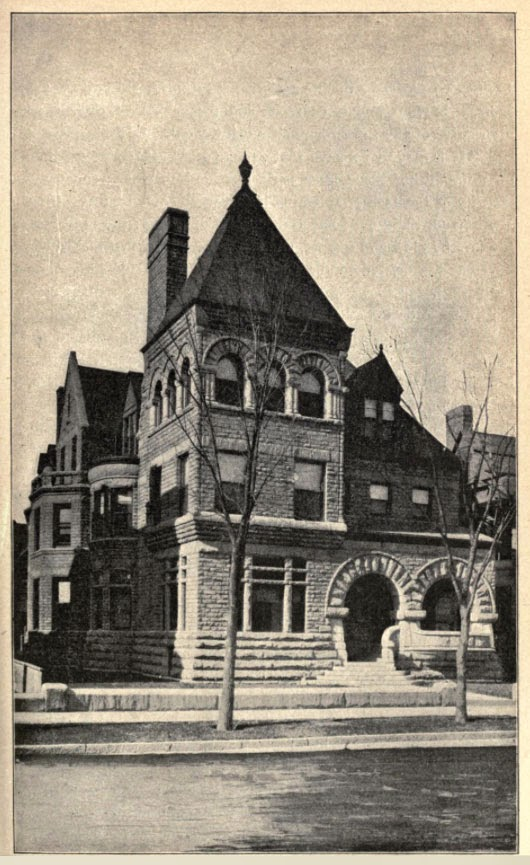
The Adolphus Clay Bartlett home. 2720 Prairie Avenue, Chicago, Illinois

The son of a sawmill operator turned school teacher, Bartlett was an only child and learned to appreciate his prosperity as he grew older. He married Mary Pitkin on August 27, 1867, together they had four children, Maie Bartlett Heard, Frederic Clay Bartlett, Frank Dickinson Bartlett, and Florence Dibell Bartlett. The family set up home at 2720 Prairie Avenue in Chicago.

Bartlett's wife died in 1890, he remarried in June 1893 to Abbey Little Hitchcock of Toledo, Ohio. Together they had one child, Eleanor Collamore Bartlett. Hitchcock, born in 1862, was eighteen years younger than her husband as well and an 1885 graduate of the University of Michigan. She died in 1938 at the age of 75 in Paris, France. Bartlett and both of his wives are interred in Oak Woods Cemetery, Chicago. During his marriage to Abbey, Bartlett had Howard Van Doren Shaw secretly construct a summer home in Lake Geneva, Wisconsin. The home was known as The House in the Woods, its construction began in 1905 and was completed in 1909. The June 1909 Ladies Home Journal featured the house and called it one of the most beautiful country houses in the nation.

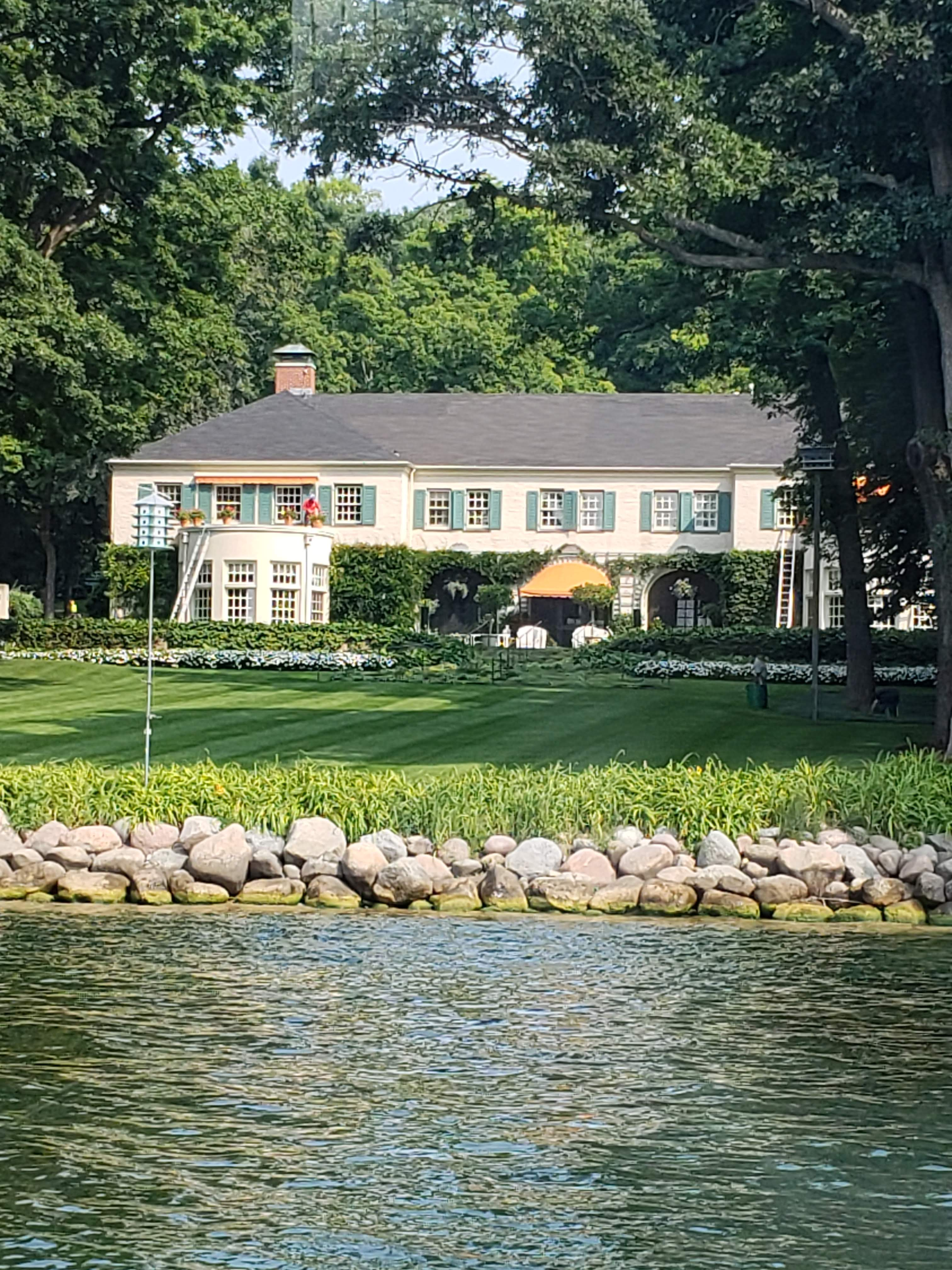
This home was constructed for Adolphus C. Bartlett, the president of the Hibbard Spencer Bartlett & Company, the company that originated the label True Value. Its architect was Howard Van Doren Shaw.

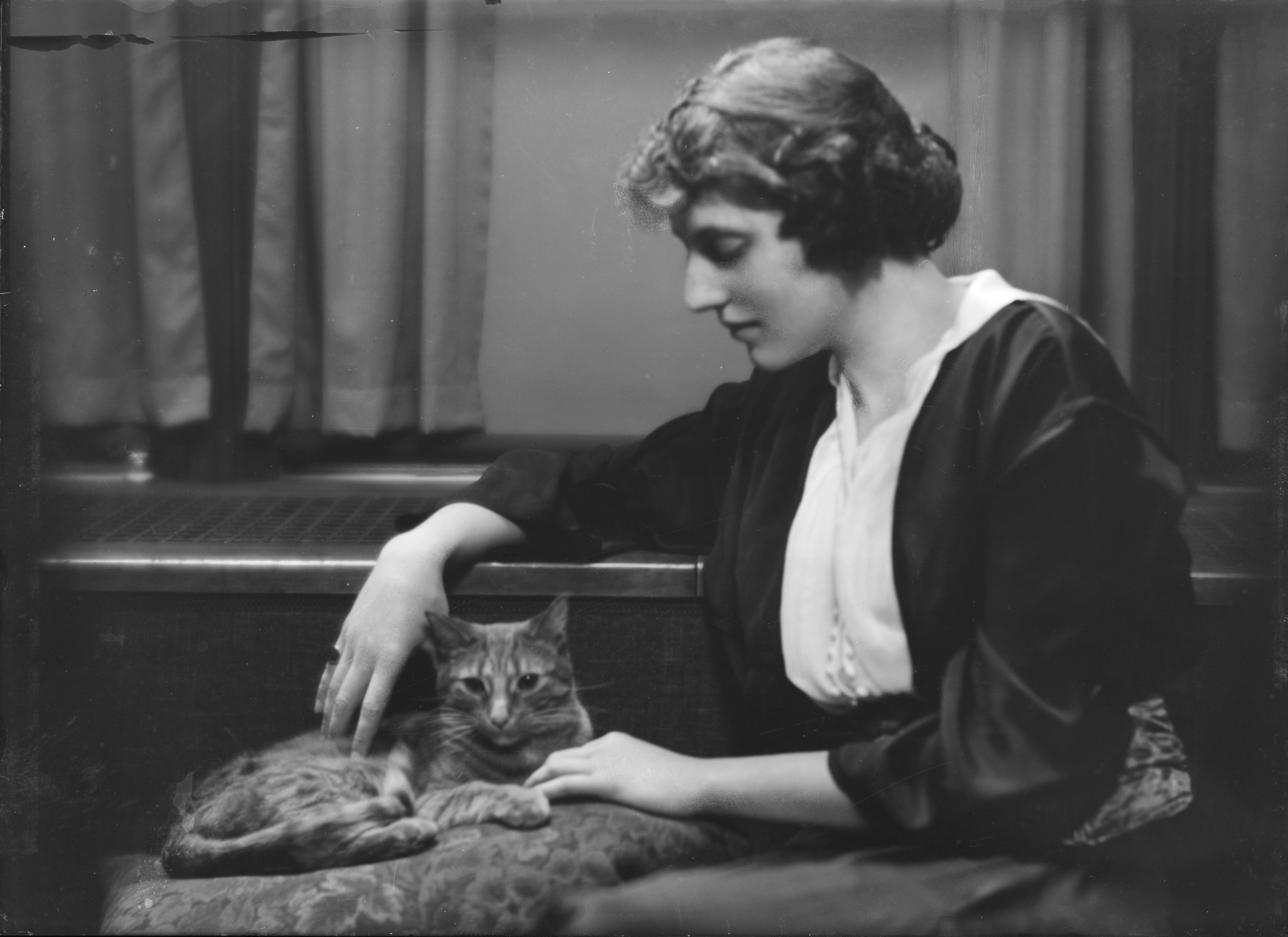
Eleanor Bartlett, portrait photograph

Bartlett's children demonstrated success in their lives, Maie married Dwight B. Heard on August 10, 1893. The next year the couple moved to Phoenix, Arizona and begin to collect Native American artifacts. Together they founded the Heard Museum in 1929 in order to house their personal collection of art. Much of the archaeological material in the Heards' collection came from La Ciudad Indian ruin, which they purchased in 1926. Frederic attended preparatory schools such as St. Paul's in Concord, New Hampshire, and the Harvard School for Boys in Chicago, however; he chose not to go to college. Instead, at the age of nineteen, he left Chicago to study art in Europe. Chicago's World's Columbian Exposition of 1893 was a major inspiration for this move. In 1894, he became among the few Americans admitted to the Royal Academy in Munich. Eventually, Frederic amassed a collection of Post-Impressionist and modernist paintings that were exhibited in several galleries. Florence Dibell Bartlett founded the Museum of International Folk Art in Santa Fe, New Mexico and Eleanor Collamore Bartlett married Mobile Alabama physician, Dr. William Perdue on September 5, 1916.

Frank Dickinson Bartlett died of appendicitis while traveling in Munich, Bavaria, July 15, 1900, at the age of twenty. As a memorial to his son, Adolphus constructed a gymnasium on the campus of the University of Chicago, completed in 1904. Frank would have graduated from Harvard University in 1902, while preparing for college at the Douglas and Manuel Training Schools in Chicago and at Stone's School in Boston.

== Community service and philanthropy ==
During his time in Chicago, Bartlett had several civic appointments as well as numerous philanthropic endeavors to better the city. He was appointed a member of the Chicago Board of Education in 1878. He was a member of the Chicago Union League, the Quadrangle Club, as well as the Caxton and Chicago Literary Clubs. Bartlett was appointed to the board of trustees during the inaugural meeting for the incorporation of The Orchestral Association which was held at the Chicago Club on December 17, 1890.

Bartlett was a trustee on two university boards, Beloit College, in Beloit, Wisconsin and The University of Chicago, where he was chairman of the Committee on Finance and Investment, and vice-chairman of Instruction and Equipment. It was in this position that he produced his most philanthropic endeavor, the funding of The Frank Dickinson Bartlett Gymnasium. The gym was built at a cost of $150,000 and continues to be utilized as a campus dining hall and the Center for Leadership and Involvement.
