= Helen Birch Bartlett Memorial Collection =

The Helen Birch Bartlett Memorial Collection is an art collection held by the Art Institute of Chicago. It is based on a collection assembled by Helen Louise Birch and her husband, Frederic Clay Bartlett.

== Birch and Bartlett ==
Helen Louise Birch married Frederic Clay Bartlett in on January 22, 1919, in Boston Massachusetts at a private ceremony attended only by Senator Albert Beveridge and his wife Catherine Eddy Beveridge, Catherine was Helen's second cousin and close friend. Also in attendance was Mrs. Marshall Field, Sr., the former Delia Spencer, who was Catherine's aunt and Helen's cousin. The Bartletts were a dynamic couple, both from like upbringings, they had similar interests and played off each other's strengths. They were a fixture of Chicago’s civic-minded elite during the early 1900s. Prior to their marriage, Frederic's art collection focused on a variety of sources, including antique, Renaissance, and 19th-century fine and decorative arts. Bartlett was himself a talented artist and muralist.

== Collecting ==
In the early 1920s, their collecting activities became more focused. Leading a cosmopolitan lifestyle, the couple traveled regularly to Europe, where they acquired a collection of modern art. Concentrating on the contemporary French avant-garde, they purchased works by André Derain, André Dunoyer de Segonzac, André Lhôte, and Amedeo Modigliani.

In the spring of 1923, they acquired Henri Matisse’s, Woman Before an Aquarium. The following year, less than one year after Frederic succeeded his father, Adolphus Clay Bartlett, as a trustee of the Art Institute of Chicago, they acquired Georges Seurat’s, Sunday Afternoon on the Island of La Grande Jatte. This purchase was made specifically with the museum in mind, at a time when the Seurat was not yet represented in any American or French public collection. Over the next several years, with the intention of placing La Grande Jatte in an appropriate artistic context, the Bartletts purchased major paintings by key Post-Impressionist artists Paul Cézanne, Paul Gauguin, Vincent van Gogh, and Henri de Toulouse-Lautrec, as well as important works by other modern masters, such as Pablo Picasso and Henri Rousseau.

=== Memorial collection ===
After only six-and-one-half years of marriage, Helen Birch Bartlett died of cancer on October 24, 1925. To honor his wife, Frederic presented their unique art collection to the Art Institute of Chicago in May 1926. The Helen Birch Memorial Collection has been permanently displayed in the museum continuously since the donation. During the 1920s and 30s, Bartlett would swap-out paintings in order to add pieces that would be a better representation or example of the work displayed. The twenty-five paintings in the collection are still in the public gallery as well as other works from the same historical time-frame.

Works of art in the collection include:

Image	Title	Year	Artist	Medium
	The Basket of Apples	c. 1893	Paul Cézanne	Oil on canvas
	Flowers (Cyclamen)	1920	Charles Demuth	Watercolor on off-white wove paper
	Fountain	early 1920s	André Derain	Oil on portrate
	Grapes	early 1920s	André Derain	Oil on canvas
	Landscape	c. 1920/25	André Derain	Oil on panel
	Still Life	c. 1920/24	André Dunoyer de Segonzac	Oil on panel
	Day of the God (Mahana no Atua)	1894	Paul Gauguin	Oil on canvas
	Polynesian Woman with Children	1901	Paul Gauguin	Oil on canvas
	Madame Roulin Rocking the Cradle (La berceuse)	1889	Vincent van Gogh	Oil on canvas
	Terrace and Observation Deck at the Moulin de Blute-Fin, Montmartre	1887	Vincent van Gogh	Oil on canvas, mounted on pressboard
	The Bedroom	1887	Vincent van Gogh	Oil on canvas, mounted on pressboard
	Head of a Soldier	1917	Ferdinand Hodler	Oil on canvas
	James Vibert, Sculptor	1907	Ferdinand Hodler	Oil on canvas
	Le Grand Muveran	1912	Ferdinand Hodler	Oil on canvas
	The Ladies of Avignon	1923	André Lhote	Oil on canvas
	The Brook	1923	John Marin	Watercolor on wove paper
	Woman Before an Aquarium	1926	Henri Matisse	Oil on canvas
	Woman on Rose Divan	1921	Henri Matisse	Oil on canvas
	Jacques and Berthe Lipchitz	1916	Amedeo Modigliani	Oil on canvas
	The Old Guitarist	late 1903 - early 1904	Pablo Picasso	Oil on panel
	The Waterfall	1910	Henri Rousseau	Oil on canvas
	A Sunday Afternoon on the Island of La Grande Jatte	1884/86	Georges Seurat	Oil on canvas
	At the Moulin Rouge	1892/95	Henri de Toulouse-Lautrec	Oil on canvas
	Ballet Dancers	1885/86	Henri de Toulouse-Lautrec	Oil on plaster, transferred to canvas
	Street in Paris	1914	Maurice Utrillo	Oil on canvas
