= Bartlett Hall =

Building at the University of Chicago

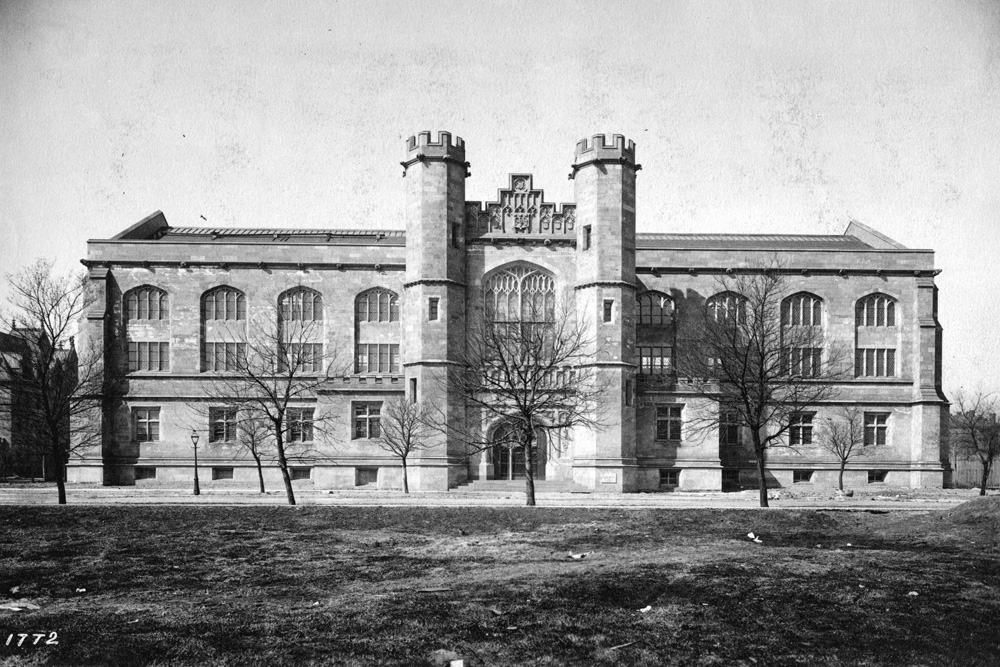
- Interactive map of Bartlett Hall
- Location: 5640 South University Avenue; Chicago, Illinois, United States
- Owner: University of Chicago
- Operator: University of Chicago
- Capacity: 3,500

Construction
- Groundbreaking: November 28, 1901
- Opened: January 29, 1904; Remodeled 2002
- Cost: 1904 $237,984.20; 2002 $13,500,000
- Architects: 1901 Shepley, Rutan & Coolidge; 2002 Bruner/Cott

Tenants
- campus dining hall Center for Leadership and Involvement

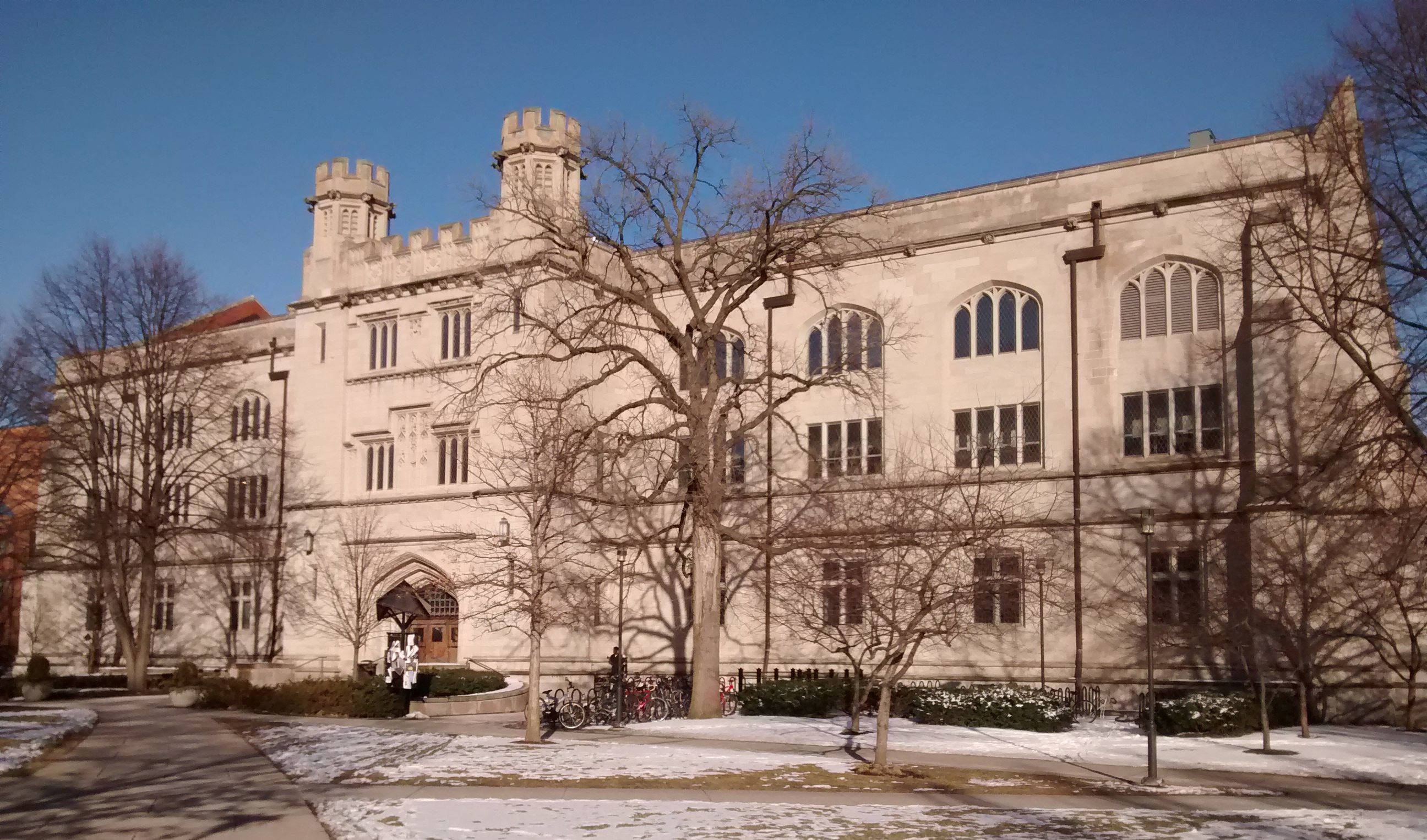
Bartlett in February 2016, now a dining hall

Bartlett Hall is a campus dining hall of the University of Chicago in Chicago, Illinois. It was called Bartlett Gymnasium and served as an athletic facility before the remodeling in 2001.

== Construction ==
Construction of the building took place between November, 1901 and January, 1904 on land owned by the university. The cost of construction, however, was covered by Hibbard, Spencer, Bartlett & Company owner Adolphus C. Bartlett. The gymnasium was built as a memorial for A.C. Bartlett's son, Frank Dickinson Bartlett, who died of appendicitis while traveling in Munich, Bavaria, July 15, 1900, at the age of twenty. Upon completion, the Gothic style building was 200 feet by 80 feet with 2 stories and a basement. The top floor contains the main gymnasium measuring 75 feet by 195 feet, that could be utilized for men's physical education courses as well as being the facility for the Chicago Maroons men's basketball team to compete. This gym also includes a 12 foot wide, 1/13 of a mile, running track which is suspended from the roof girders. Additionally, the ground floor contained locker rooms, faculty exercising room, a 60 foot long by 28 foot wide swimming pool, bathrooms and offices. The basement was focused on specialized rooms for athletic teams. In 1932, the team moved into the newly built Henry Crown Field House, and the building became underutilized and fell into disrepair. In 2002, the gymnasium was remodeled to become a full-time dining hall.

=== Mural and stained-glass ===
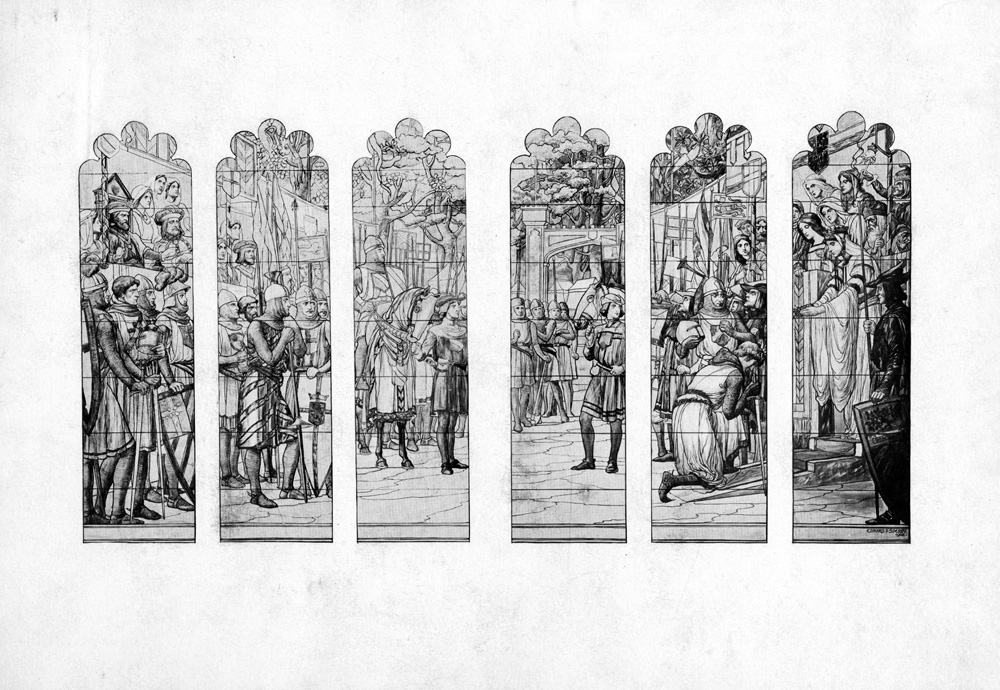
This drawing by Frederic Clay Bartlett was utilized by Edward Peck Sperry while creating the Frank Dickinson Bartlett Memorial Window.

Upon its completion, the gymnasium contained a mural within the front entrance hall created by Frederic Clay Bartlett, brother of Frank. The mural depicts Athletic Games in the Middle Ages with the participants dressed in appropriate attire. The gym also included the Bartlett Memorial Window, presented to the university by William Gold Hibbard. The stained-glass was taken from Walter Scott's Ivanhoe and represents Rowena crowning Ivanhoe at the close of the second day's tournament at Ashby de la Zouch. The window was designed and drawn by Edward P. Sperry, a close friend of Frederic Bartlett as well an associate of Louis Comfort Tiffany. Over 15,000 pieces of glass were used in the construction of the window. The window was placed above the main entrance of the gymnasium, facing Lexington Avenue.

In 2001, during the renovation of the gymnasium, the university removed the stained-glass with a promise to restore and reinstall it. Through an architectural firm, Brunner/Cott Associates, Inc., an art glass conservator deemed the window was in need of extensive conservation work and required its removal in order to complete the task.

=== Opening ceremonies ===
On Friday, January 29, 1904, the formal opening of the Frank Dickinson Bartlett Gymnasium took place in front of 1,000 friends of the university, which included members of the faculty, alumni, student body, and university trustees. The dedication ceremony took place immediately following the annual football dinner hosted by President Harper. Addresses to the attendees included: The Presentation Address by Adolphus C. Bartlett; The Acceptance of the Gymnasium on Behalf of the University by William Rainey Harper, President of the University; A Young Man's Memorial by Frank Wakeley Gunsaulus, President of the Armour Institute of Technology; Address on Behalf of the Division of Physical Culture and Athletics by Amos Alonzo Stagg, Director of the Division of Physical Culture; Address on Behalf of the Administrative Board of Physical Culture and Athletics by Eri Baker Hulbert, Dean of the Divinity School; and Address on Behalf of the Alumni and Students by William Scott Bond, Class of 1897. The presentations took place on the second floor of the new gymnasium, with the University of Chicago Military Band located on the running track above the audience. The invocation was given by Reverend Professor Edward Judson D.D., of the Divinity School followed by the previously mentioned speeches. Following the addresses, a reception, hosted by President and Mrs. Harper, was held within the gym.
