= Lloyd Cotsen =

Lloyd Edward Cotsen (February 25, 1929 – May 8, 2017) was an American businessman.

== Early life and family ==
Cotsen was born in Boston on February 25, 1929, to Lloyd Edward Cotsen Sr. and Sophie Cotsen. He obtained a bachelor's degree in history from Princeton University before serving in the U.S. Navy. He later returned to Princeton to study architecture and participated in a prehistoric excavation in Greece as a field architect.

His first wife, Joanne Stolaroff, was murdered along with their 13-year-old son, Noah in Beverly Hills in 1979. Cotsen's second marriage, to Jacqueline Brandwynne, ended in divorce. He is survived by his third wife, Margit Sperling, two daughters and a son.

== Career ==
After completing an MBA from Harvard Business School, Cotsen joined Natone, a cosmetics supply company founded by his father-in-law, Emanuel Stolaroff. Natone would later be renamed Neutrogena. Cotsen played his role in the rise of the company's amber-colored glycerin soap. He held multiple leadership positions within the company, including president (1967), became the CEO in 1973, and the chairman in 1991. He sold Neutrogena in 1994, with the shares he controlled amounting to almost $350 million before taxes.

After his retirement, Cotsen dedicated his time to collecting contemporary textile fragments, Japanese ceramics, and turned wood. At the time of his death on May 8, 2017, in Beverly Hills, California, Cotsen had donated approximately half of his collection to institutions such as the Asian Art Museum in San Francisco, Princeton University, and the Museum of International Folk Art.

He was a major donor of the University of California, Los Angeles's Cotsen Institute of Archaeology, which was renamed in his honor in 1999.
