= Maie Bartlett Heard =

Arizona-based collector and philanthropist (1868–1951)

- Maie Bartlett Heard
- Born: 1868
- Died: 1951
- Occupation(s): art collector, philanthropist, and museum founder

Maie Bartlett Heard (1868–1951) was an Arizona-based collector and philanthropist, who cofounded the Heard Museum of native American art.

== Background ==
Born on June 11, 1868, in Chicago, to parents Adolphus C. Bartlett and Mary Pitkin. Her father was the president of the Hibbard Spencer Bartlett & Company, which would later become True Value Hardware. Through her father’s company she met her husband, Dwight B. Heard. Dwight and Maie married in 1893 and in 1895 they made the decision to move out West due to issues with Dwight’s health, finally settling in Phoenix, Arizona. Dwight became a successful businessman in Phoenix, as he chose to invest in land, as well as raise crops and livestock. Seventeen years after moving to Phoenix he purchased the Arizona Republican newspaper, which would later become the Arizona Republic. Maie's sister Florence Dibell Bartlett was also a collector of art and in particular textiles, who donated her collection to the Museum of International Folk Art in New Mexico.

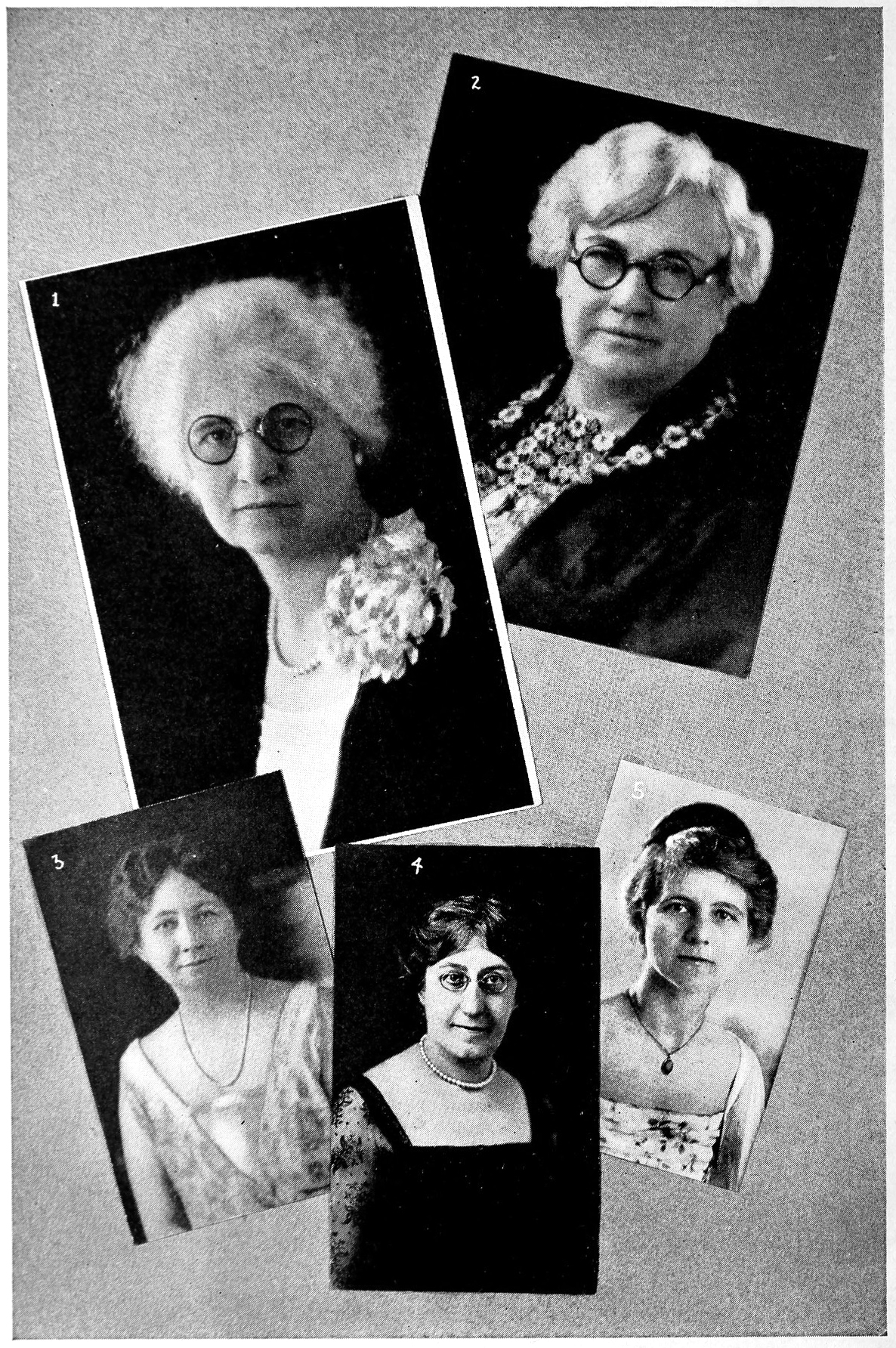
A Few of the Eminent Women of Arizona, C. Louise Boheringer, Mattie L. Williams, Marie Bartlett Heard, Margaret Wheeler Ross, Edith O. Kitt, Women of the West, 1928

Dwight and Maie built their 6,000 square foot home, Casa Blanca, in what is now northern Phoenix. Dwight and Maie took an interest in politics and would often host political events at their home. Invited guests included not only local political figures and businessmen including Marshall Field and Harvey S. Firestone, but better known politicians such as Theodore Roosevelt and Herbert Hoover. In their decision to play an active part in their community, the Heards found a love of collecting Native American artifacts. In 1926 the Heards purchased a Hohokam ruin called La Cuidad. Many of the pieces from this site comprised Maie's initial collection and fueled the fire for her love of Native American artifacts that would continue until her death in 1951.

== Heard Museum ==
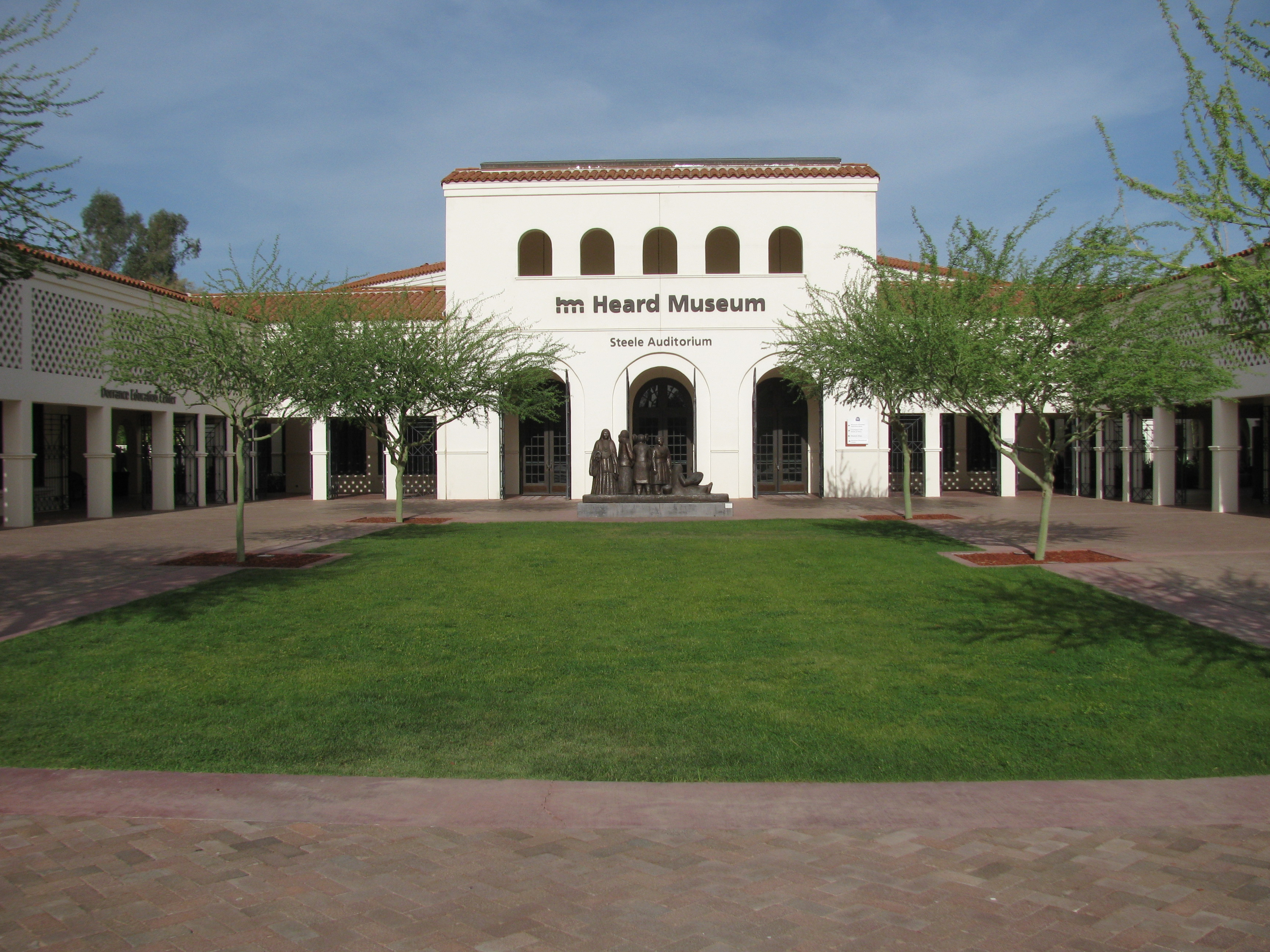
The Heard Museum, Phoenix, Arizona

The Heards collection eventually outgrew the space available in Casa Blanca, so they decided to design and build a museum nearby to hold their vast collection. Unfortunately, Dwight Heard died nine months before the Heard Museum opened on December 26, 1929.

Maie's passion continued for the next two decades, as she introduced the Native American culture to visitors of the museum. She continued to search for additional pieces to add to the collection and would personally give tours and lectures on the history and culture of the Native Americans whose art was housed within the museum. The museum itself is now 130,000 square feet, almost 8 times the size of the original museum in 1929, and is recognized internationally for it extensive collections, exhibits and festivals.

== Other Phoenix institutions ==
While her love of Native American artifacts was her passion, as a philanthropist Maie also played an active part in giving back to her community. She and other members of the Phoenix Women's Club worked to raise money for a library to be built in their city. In 1908 the Carnegie Library opened. Maie and other members of the Bartlett family also donated 6.5 acres that would be the home of the Civic Center House as well as the YWCA gymnasium. The civic center would later become the Phoenix Art Museum. Maie was also instrumental in the development of the Phoenix Little Theater. In 1924 Dwight and Maie donated the carriage house at Casa Blanca to the performing troupe, who would continue to hold their performances there through 1951.

Maie and other influential women from the Phoenix area attended a speech by Margaret Sanger, who shared that Arizona was second in the nation with respect to deaths of infants and mothers. Their hard work resulted in the opening of the Mother's Heath Clinic of Phoenix on October 1, 1937. Birth control and options for family planning were now available to married women regardless of their ability to pay for services rendered. This facility would later become the Planned Parenthood of Central and Northern Arizona.

== Death and recognition ==
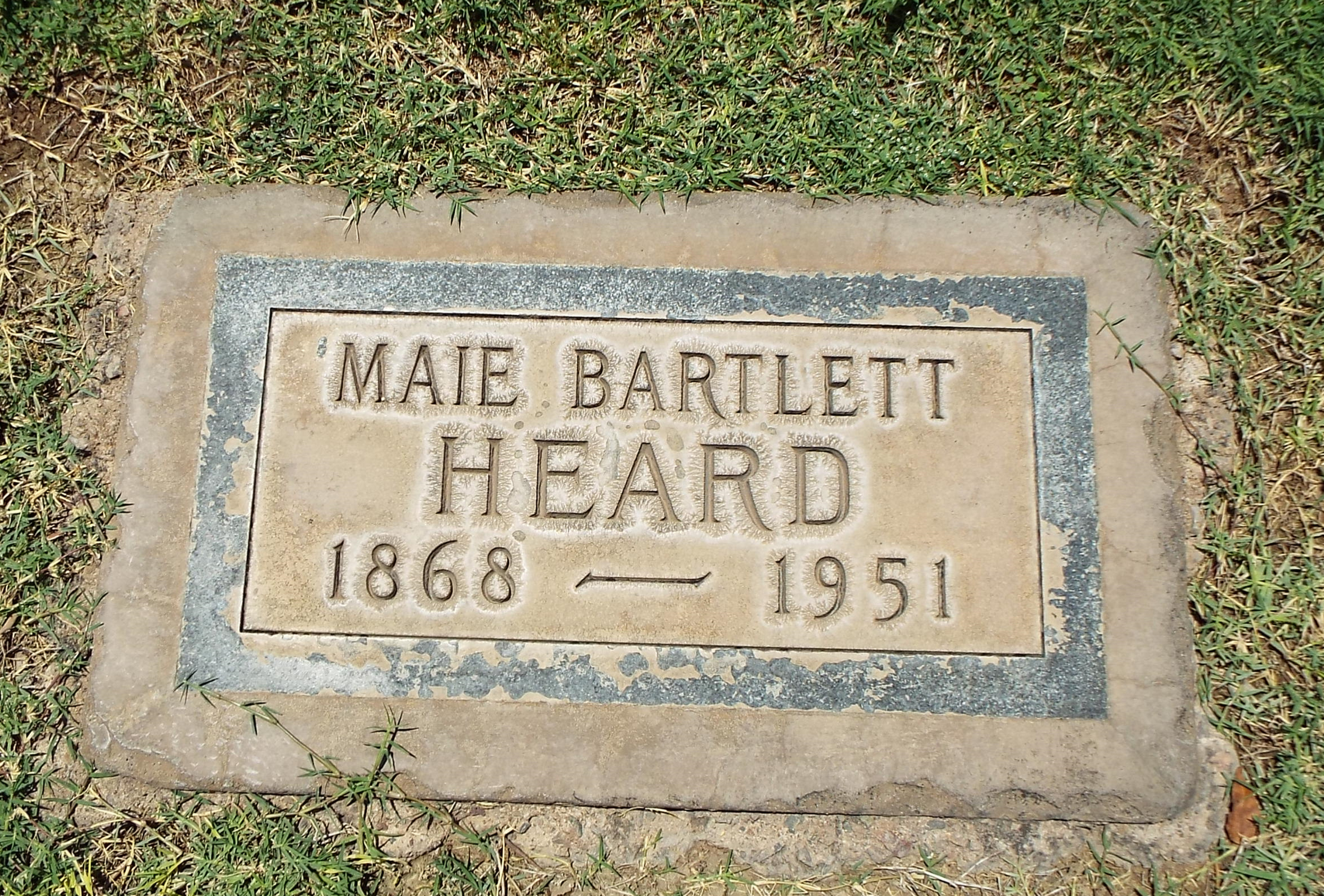
Grave-site of Maie Bartlett Heard in Greenwood/Memory Lawn Mortuary & Cemetery

The Phoenix Rotary Club recognized Maie's significant contributions to the children of Phoenix in May 1948. Later that year Beta Sigma Phi honored her as well with the title of Arizona Woman of the Year. Maie Heard Elementary School in Phoenix was named after her, and honors her love of reading and community involvement.

Maie died exactly 22 years after her husband Dwight's death, on March 14, 1951. She was 83 years old.
