= 1924 Arizona gubernatorial election =

- November 4, 1924
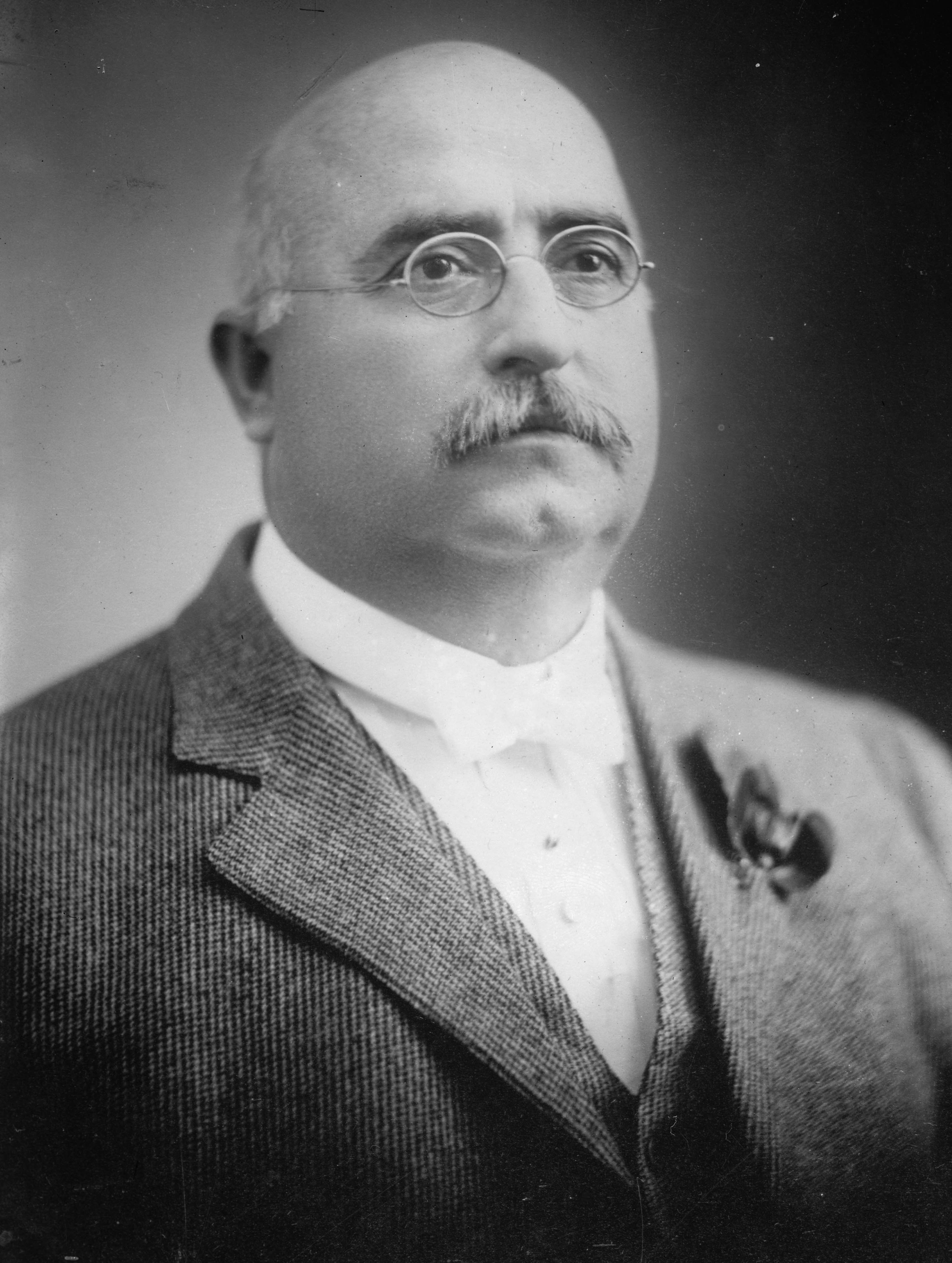

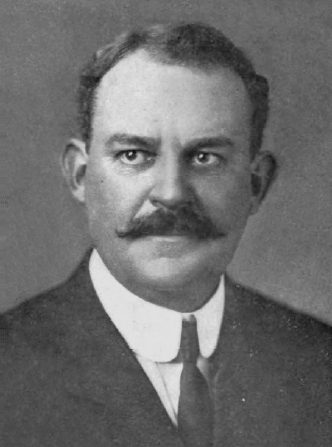
Nominee	George W. P. Hunt	Dwight B. Heard
Party	Democratic	Republican
Popular vote	38,372	37,571
Percentage	50.53%	49.47%
- County results Hunt: 50–60% 60–70% Heard: 50–60%
Governor before election
George W. P. Hunt
Democratic
Elected Governor
George W. P. Hunt
Democratic

The 1924 Arizona gubernatorial election took place on November 4, 1924. Despite being a Republican year nationally, President Coolidge's election in Arizona was rather close. He only took Arizona with 40% of the vote against Davis' 35% and La Follette's 23%. The closest Arizona gubernatorial election since 1916, Hunt's lead in votes would continue to decline.

With barely a percent separating the two, Hunt narrowly beat owner of the Arizona Republican newsletter, Dwight Heard. Heard had in fact previously backed 1914 Progressive nominee George Young against Hunt over the Republican, Ralph Cameron, and had been an enemy of Hunt for over a decade at this point.

Governor W. P. Hunt was sworn in for a fifth term as Governor on January 5, 1925.

== Democratic primary ==
=== Candidates ===
- George W. P. Hunt, incumbent Governor, former Ambassador to Siam
- Sidney P. Osborn, former Secretary of State, former primary candidate for Governor
- Edward W. Samuell, farmer, resigned as Secretary of the Board of Directors of State Institutions to run in primary

=== Results ===
Democratic primary results
Party	Candidate	Votes	%
Democratic	George W. P. Hunt (incumbent)	23,125	55.69%
Democratic	Sidney P. Osborn	10,812	26.04%
Democratic	E. W. Samuell	7,590	18.28%
Total votes		41,527	100.00%

== General election ==
Arizona gubernatorial election, 1924
Party	Candidate	Votes	%	±%
Democratic	George W. P. Hunt (incumbent)	38,372	50.53%	−4.41%
Republican	Dwight B. Heard	37,571	49.47%	+4.41%
Majority		801	1.05%	
Total votes		75,943	100.00%	
Democratic hold		Swing	-8.83%	

=== Results by county ===
County	George W. P. Hunt Democratic		Dwight B. Heard Republican		Margin		Total votes cast
County	#	%	#	%	#	%	Total votes cast
Apache	721	51.28%	685	48.72%	36	2.56%	1,406
Cochise	4,900	49.96%	4,908	50.04%	-8	-0.08%	9,808
Coconino	1,243	49.96%	1,245	50.04%	-2	-0.08%	2,488
Gila	4,068	61.39%	2,559	38.61%	1,509	22.77%	6,627
Graham	1,603	60.26%	1,057	39.74%	546	20.53%	2,660
Greenlee	864	62.47%	519	37.53%	345	24.95%	1,383
Maricopa	11,566	47.84%	12,610	52.16%	-1,044	-4.32%	24,176
Mohave	914	46.09%	1,069	53.91%	-155	-7.82%	1,983
Navajo	1,261	49.68%	1,277	50.32%	-16	-0.63%	2,538
Pima	4,123	49.10%	4,274	50.90%	-151	-1.80%	8,397
Pinal	1,379	50.77%	1,337	49.23%	42	1.55%	2,716
Santa Cruz	743	51.07%	712	48.93%	31	2.13%	1,455
Yavapai	3,496	49.18%	3,613	50.82%	-117	-1.65%	7,109
Yuma	1,491	46.64%	1,706	53.36%	-215	-6.73%	3,197
Totals	38,372	50.53%	37,571	49.47%	801	1.05%	75,943

==== Counties that flipped from Democratic to Republican ====
- Cochise
- Coconino
- Maricopa
- Mohave
- Navajo
- Yavapai
- Yuma

== Bibliography ==
- Goff, John S. (1973). "The First Years of Statehood, George The Fifth, and Bibliographical and Biographical Notes". George W. P. Hunt and his Arizona. Phoenix: Socio-Technical Publications. pp. 63, 159–162, 278.
- Dubin, Michael J. (2013). "Annual Summary". United States Gubernatorial Elections, 1912-1931: The Official Results by State and County. McFarland. p. 10.
