= Florence Dibell Bartlett =

American heiress and folk art collector

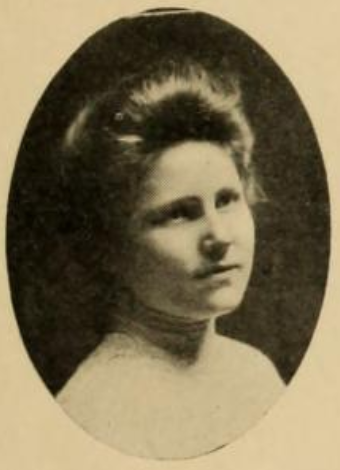
- Florence Dibell Bartlett, from the 1904 yearbook of Smith College
- Born: 1881
- Died: 1953 (aged 71–72)
- Occupation(s): Philanthropist, art collector
- Father: Adolphus C. Bartlett
- Relatives: Maie Bartlett Heard (sister)

Florence Dibell Bartlett (1881–1953) was a Chicago heiress and folk art collector, who is best known for founding the Museum of International Folk Art (MOIFA) in Santa Fe, New Mexico, United States, the world's first international folk art museum. The museum was founded to express her belief that folk art is a bond between the people of the world.

== Biography ==
Bartlett was the daughter of Adolphus Bartlett, a wealthy partner in a large wholesale hardware business in Chicago that became part of True Value Hardware. She graduated from Smith College in 1904. Florence Bartlett's sister, Maie Bartlett Heard, was co-founder of the Heard Museum in Phoenix.

Florence Bartlett had a winter home, El Mirador, in Alcalde, New Mexico, near Los Luceros, the home of Mary Cabot Wheelwright, founder of the Wheelwright Museum of the American Indian, also in Santa Fe. She died in 1953, in her early seventies.

== Museum of International Folk Art (MOIFA) ==
Bartlett gave her Alcalde house and property to the State of New Mexico, as part of her gift that founded MOIFA. The museum opened to the public in 1953 and has gained national and international recognition as the home to the world’s largest collection of folk art. Its collection of more than 135,000 artifacts is divided into four exhibition wings: Bartlett, Girard, Hispanic Heritage, and Neutrogena.

The Bartlett Wing, named in honor of the museum's founder, has two galleries with rotating exhibits from the museum's collection and gathered in field studies of specific cultures or art forms. Focuses in the Bartlett wing have ranged from Turkish, Tibetan and Swedish traditions, to New Deal-era New Mexican art.
