= Quadrangle Club (University of Chicago) =

Membership club

Coordinates: 41.7912°N 87.5976°W

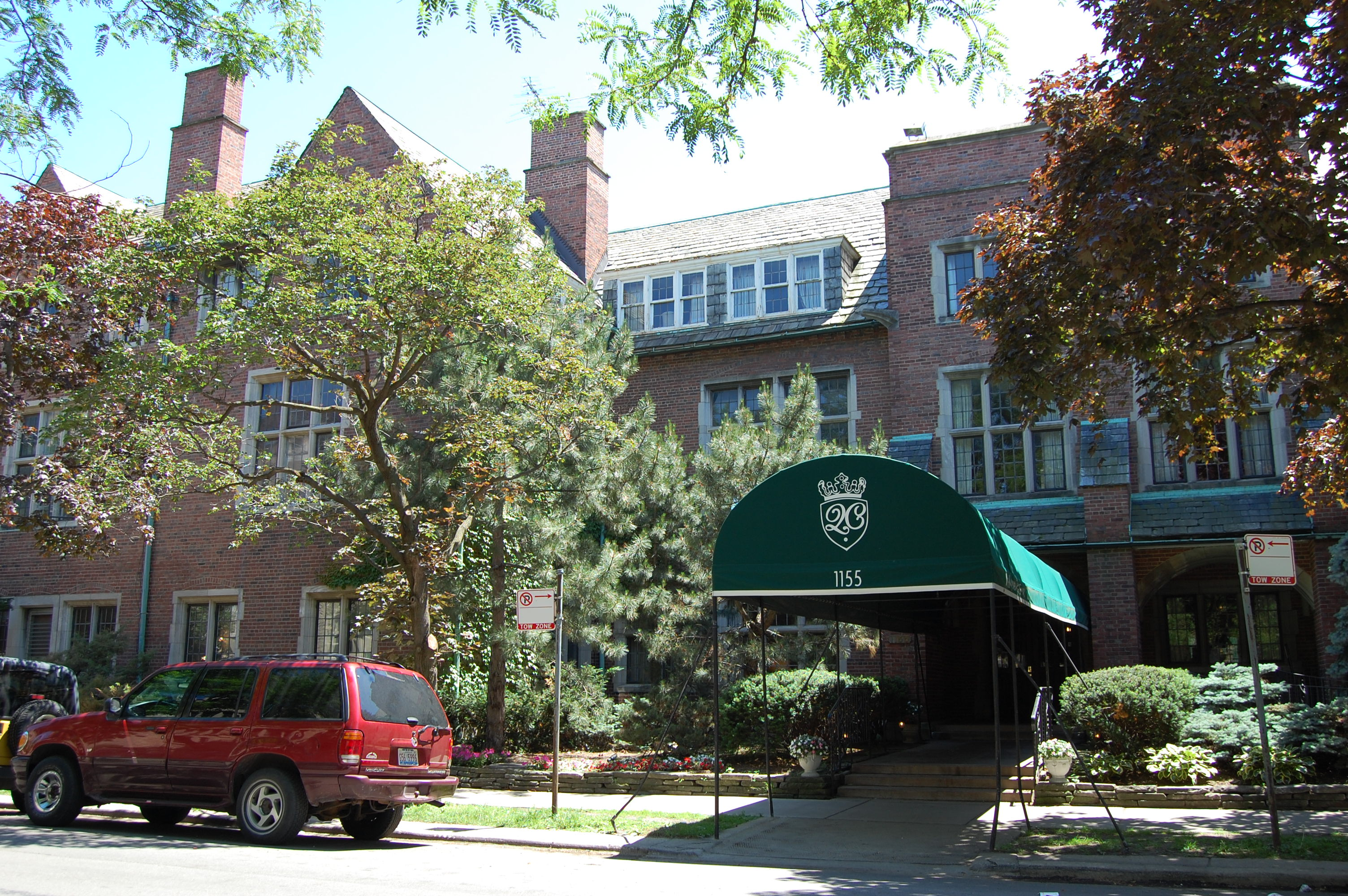
Entrance to the Quadrange Club, on the campus of the University of Chicago

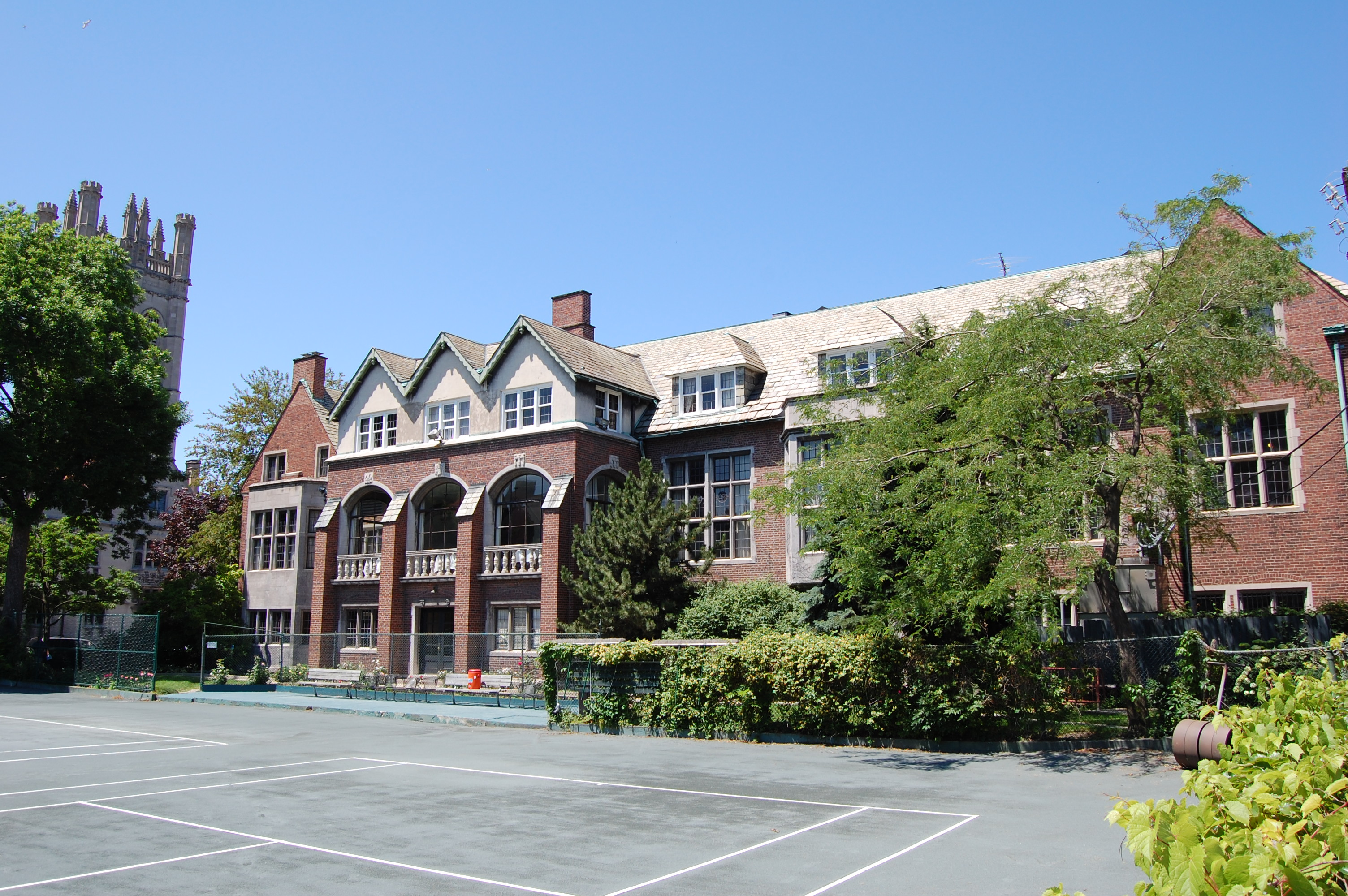
Back of the club, showing a portion of the clay tennis courts

The Quadrangle Club is a membership club at the University of Chicago. It is located at 1155 East 57th Street (the southeast corner of 57th Street and University Avenue) in Chicago. It has a full-service dining room, a bar, several lounges, and sleeping quarters for members and/or their guests. It has 17 sleeping rooms, including 5 suites with an extra sitting room. It is one of the few locations in the city of Chicago that has green clay tennis courts.

The club is organized under United States laws for 501(c)(7) Social and Recreation Clubs. In 2023, it claimed total revenue of $3,063,606 and total assets of $1,047,033.

== History ==
The Quadrangle Club was created in 1893 as a social club for the faculty of the newly established University of Chicago. It was to be a place to gather for "study, socialization, and especially communication," and from its inception was open to members of the community as well as to faculty. It was spearheaded by Robert Francis Harper, an associate professor of Near Eastern Languages and the younger brother of William Rainey Harper, first president of the university. It originally occupied a suite in the Barry Hotel, located at 59th Street between Dorchester and Blackstone.

By 1895, the club had outgrown the hotel suite, and land was purchased for the construction of a club house on the southeast corner of 58th and University, the current site of the Oriental Institute. The new club house opened in 1896 and contained billiard and card rooms, a gymnasium, some sleeping rooms, and a small ladies' room for the wives of members. Outside, to the south, there were tennis courts. The Club hosted many social events, including lectures, recitals, and dances. As an afterthought, a small dining room and basement kitchen were added to the building. In 1897, fires led to modifications of the building by Howard Van Doren Shaw, a distinguished architect who later designed the building that the club currently occupies.

In 1916, to make way for Rockefeller Chapel, the Quadrangle Club agreed to relocate to a parcel of land on the corner of 57th Street and University Avenue, the present site. Howard Van Doren Shaw designed the new building, which opened on December 21, 1922. Shaw designed a building resembling an English country house, with large open spaces and—on the second floor, facing the tennis courts—abundant natural light. In the summer of 1929, the old club house was moved (in two pieces) two blocks west to 956–960 East 58th Street, where it was renamed Ingleside Hall.

The Quadrangle Club enjoyed a golden age during the 1920s and 1930s when it functioned as a popular gentleman's club offering billiards, a card room, and stimulating lunchtime conversation. The "Round Table", a lunchtime tradition in which professors from diverse fields gathered to share ideas, flourished.

As World War II came to an end the Quad Club found itself redefined by the changes in the times. There was pressure to admit all faculty, including women professors. The decline of the South Side of Chicago and the attractiveness of suburban living to some faculty decreased the potential membership. It lost many amenities of the gentleman's club as financial pressures forced rooms to be taken over for catering affairs. The club has always kept its dues and fees low to accommodate faculty members with modest incomes, and catering helped to make up the inevitable deficits.

== Relationship with the university ==
The Quadrangle Club's relationship with the university has varied over the years as the club tried to accommodate both "town" and "gown", but it has always been close. In part to facilitate needed repairs to the building, the university took formal control of the club in April 2007. In exchange, the university promised to rehabilitate the building and maintain the club's commitment to its members through the hiring of the outside management company Flik Conference Centers, a division of Compass Group's North American Division. In 2011 outside management services were transferred from Flik to Restaurant Associates, another division of the Compass Group.

While the Quadrangle Club is the University of Chicago's faculty club, university staff, parents, and neighbors are welcome to join. Roughly one quarter of the club's membership are not University of Chicago faculty or staff.
