= Dwight B. Heard =

Arizona rancher and publisher (1869–1929)

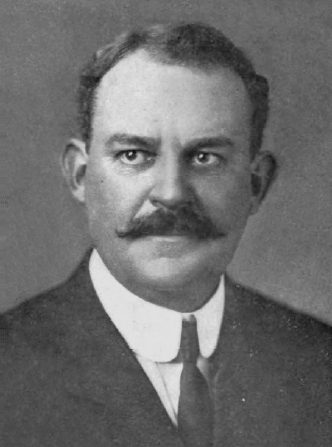
Dwight B. Heard

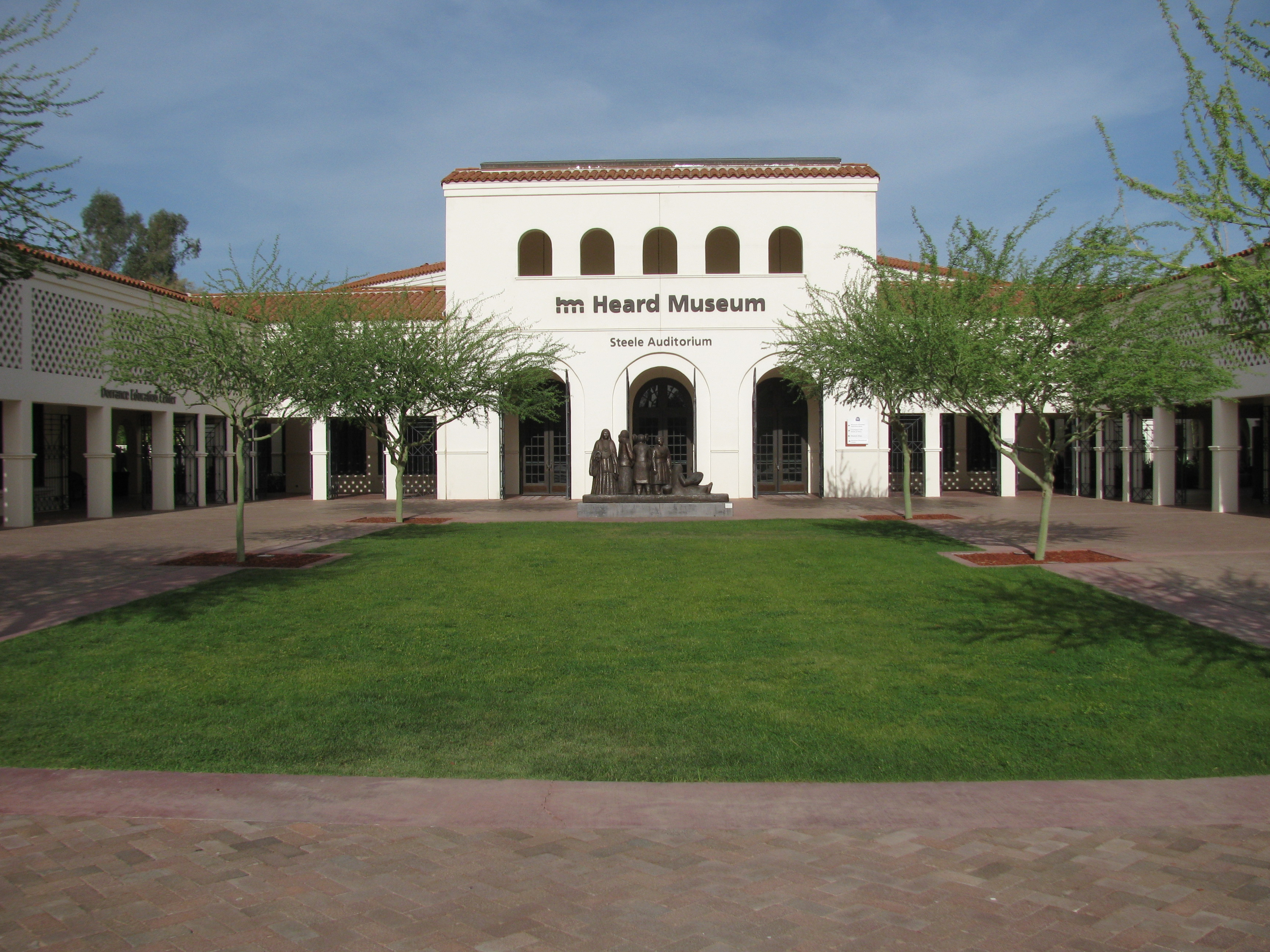
Heard Museum, Phoenix, Arizona

Dwight Bancroft Heard (1 May 1869 – 14 Mar 1929) was an American rancher in Arizona, along with the president of the Arizona Cotton Association. He is famous for publishing the Arizona Republican, now The Arizona Republic, from 1912 to 1929. He was a delegate to the Republican National Convention in 1928. He died in 1929, a few months before the Heard Museum, a Native American art museum named after him, was opened.

== Early life ==
Heard moved to Chicago from Wayland, Massachusetts, shortly after high school. He began working at Hibbard, Spencer, Bartlett and Company.

During his time as an employee, Heard met his wife, Maie Bartlett, (1868–1951) while being mentored by Adolphus Bartlett (1844–1922), the father of Maie. In 1893, they were married. Just one year later, the couple moved to Arizona after Heard was diagnosed with lung ailments. They settled in Phoenix in 1895 and decided to make it their home.

== Arizona ==
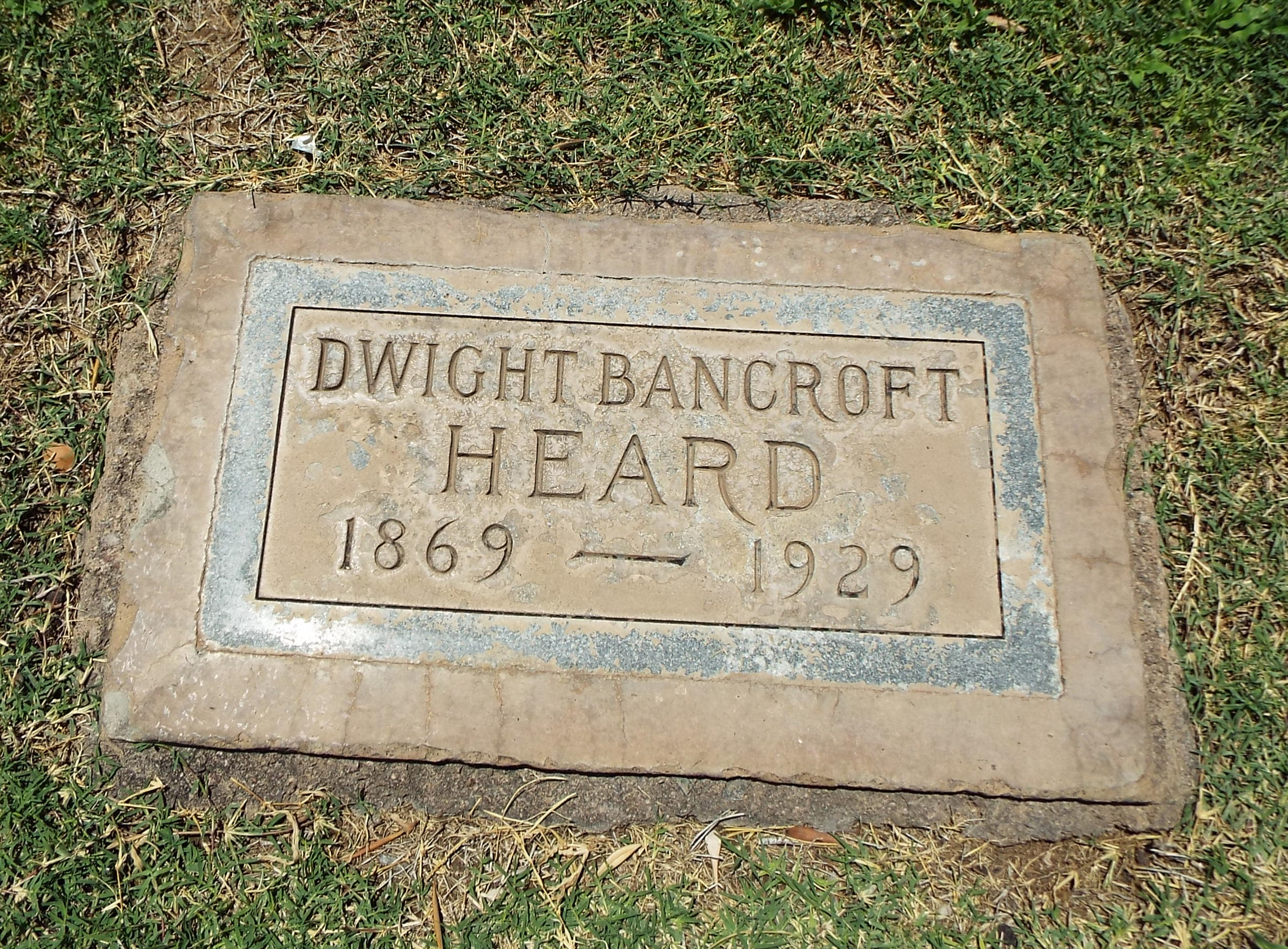
Grave-site of Dwight Bancroft Heard in the Greenwood/Memory Lawn Mortuary & Cemetery in Phoenix, Arizona

In Arizona, Heard was one of the largest landowners in the Salt River Valley. He owned the Bartlett-Heard Land and Cattle Company, which sold cattle, alfalfa, citrus trees and cotton in South Phoenix. He also was the president of the Arizona Cotton Growers' Association, and was credited for making Arizona's cotton industry more competitive. His other business interests included real estate development and investment lending. He was a delegate to the Republican National Convention in 1928. In 1912 Heard supported former President Theodore Roosevelt over official Republican nominee Howard Taft. That same year, he purchased the Arizona Republican, now known as the Arizona Republic, and published it until his death in 1929.

In 1924 he was the Republican nominee for Governor, narrowly losing to incumbent George W. P. Hunt.

Soon after his death, the Heard Museum was founded, housing Native American artifacts the Heards had acquired during their life in Phoenix. Maie Heard worked as the curator and director of the museum for twenty years. She died exactly 22 years after her husband Dwight's death in 1951.

== Related reading ==
- Bradford Luckingham (1995) Phoenix: The History of a Southwestern Metropolis (University of Arizona Press) ISBN 978-0816511167
- Jon Talton ( 2015) A Brief History of Phoenix (Arcadia Publishing) ISBN 978-1467118446

Party political offices
| Preceded by Thomas Edward Campbell | Republican nominee for Governor of Arizona; 1924 | Succeeded by Elias S. Clark |
