= Museum of International Folk Art =

Art museum in New Mexico, USA

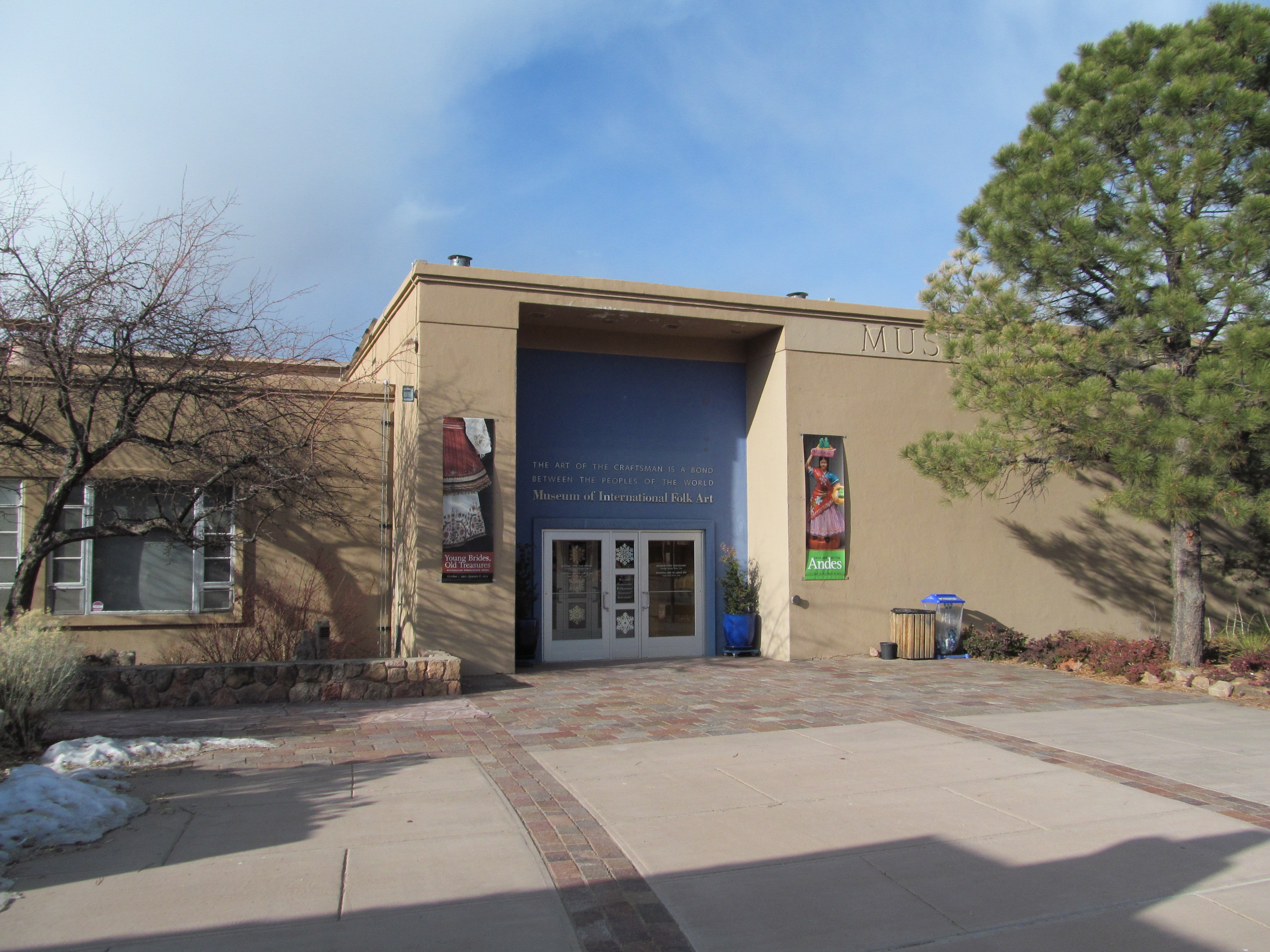
- Established: 1953
- Location: Santa Fe, New Mexico
- Coordinates: 35.66406°N 105.92618°W
- Type: Folk art
- Collection size: >135,000 artifacts
- Executive director: Charlie Lockwood
- Public transit access: Santa Fe Trails (bus)
- Website: moifa.org

The Museum of International Folk Art (MOIFA) is a state-run institution in Santa Fe, New Mexico, United States. It is one of many cultural institutions operated by the New Mexico Department of Cultural Affairs.

Its holdings exceed 130,000 objects from more than 100 countries and are widely described as the world's largest collection of international folk art.

== History ==
The museum was founded by Florence Dibell Bartlett, opened to the public in 1953, and has gained national and international recognition as the home to the world's largest collection of international folk art. The collection of more than 135,000 artifacts forms the basis for exhibitions in four distinct wings: Bartlett, Girard, Hispanic Heritage, and Neutrogena. The original building, a gift to the state from Bartlett, was designed by New Mexico architect John Gaw Meem.

The Girard Wing, with its exhibition Multiple Visions: A Common Bond, showcases folk art, popular art, toys and textiles from more than 100 nations. The exhibition was designed by the donor, Alexander Girard, an architect and designer. The collection includes toys and dolls, costumes, masks, textiles of all kinds, religious folk art, paintings, and beadwork. More than a million visitors have passed through the Girard exhibition since it opened in 1982. Multiple Visions: A Common Bond displays approximately 10% of the collection; the exhibit and collection serve as a resource for scholars, artists and educators, from preschool to college level.

The museum's Neutrogena Collection, donated by former Neutrogena CEO Lloyd Cotsen in 1995, comprises more than 2,500 textiles, ceramics and carvings from around the world. The Hispanic Heritage Wing opened in 1988 and, at that time, was the only designated space for Spanish/Hispanic art in the state. This wing underwent renovation and reopened in the fall of 2009, continuing its focus on Hispanic folk art from New Mexico and beyond.

The Bartlett Wing, named in honor of museum founder Florence Dibell Bartlett, offers rotating exhibitions based on the museum collections and on field studies of specific cultures or art forms. Exhibitions in this wing have ranged from Turkish, Tibetan and Swedish traditions to New Deal–era art in New Mexico, Appearances Deceive, recycled objects, Mayólica, ¡CARNAVAL!, Dancing Shadows, Epic Tales: Wayang Kulit of Indonesia, and Macedonian Embroidered Dress.

The museum is on Museum Hill in Santa Fe, and is home to the International Folk Art Market Santa Fe every July. The Museum of International Folk Art shares Milner Plaza with another state-run institution, the Museum of Indian Arts and Culture/Laboratory of Anthropology. Adjacent to both of these are the private Wheelwright Museum of the American Indian and Museum of Spanish Colonial Art and the Santa Fe Botanical Garden.

== See also ==
- Mingei International Museum of World Folk Art, California
- Sallie Wagner
