= 1908–09 IAAUS men's basketball season =

- Helms National Champions: Chicago (retroactive selection in 1943)
- Player of the Year (Helms): John Schommer, Chicago (retroactive selection in 1944)

The 1908–09 IAAUS men's basketball season began in December 1908, progressed through the regular season, and concluded in March 1909.

== Rule changes ==
- A dribbler was allowed to shoot. Previously, a player could not shoot immediately after dribbling the ball.
- The double dribble became illegal, with the dribble defined as "continuous passage of the ball."
- A second official was added to games in an attempt to reduce rough play.

== Season headlines ==
- Chicago finished with a 12–0 record and won the Western Conference championship for a second straight season. The Maroons attempted to schedule a postseason competition for the mythical national championship with Columbia (15–1) or Pennsylvania (19–6) — both former members of the Eastern Intercollegiate Basketball League, which had collapsed after the previous season and would not resume conference play until the 1910–11 season — but without success.
- In February 1943, the Helms Athletic Foundation retroactively selected Chicago as its national champion for the 1908–09 season.
- In 1995, the Premo-Porretta Power Poll retroactively selected Chicago as its top-ranked team for the 1908–09 season.

== Conference membership changes ==
School	Former Conference	New Conference
Columbia Lions	Eastern Intercollegiate Basketball League	Independent
Cornell Big Red	Eastern Intercollegiate Basketball League	Independent
Penn Quakers	Eastern Intercollegiate Basketball League	Independent
Princeton Tigers	Eastern Intercollegiate Basketball League	Independent
Yale Bulldogs	Eastern Intercollegiate Basketball League	Independent

== Regular season ==
=== Conferences ===
==== Conference winners ====
Conference	Regular Season Winner	Conference Player of the Year	Conference Tournament	Tournament Venue (City)	Tournament Winner
Missouri Valley Intercollegiate Athletic Association	Nebraska (North); Kansas (South)	None selected	No Tournament; Kansas was conference champion		
Western Conference	Chicago	None selected	No Tournament		

==== Conference standings ====
1908–09 Missouri Valley Intercollegiate Athletic Association men's basketball standings
	Conf.				Overall
Team	W		L	PCT	W		L	PCT
North Division
Nebraska	5	–	5	.500	8	–	15	.348
Iowa State	4	–	4	.500	4	–	10	.286
Drake	3	–	5	.375	3	–	7	.300
South Division
Kansas†	8	–	2	.800	25	–	3	.893
Missouri	3	–	5	.375	11	–	5	.688
Washington University	3	–	5	.375	3	–	5	.375
† Conference championship winner

1908–09 Western Conference men's basketball standings
	Conf.				Overall
Team	W		L	PCT	W		L	PCT
Chicago	12	–	0	1.000	12	–	0	1.000
Purdue	6	–	4	.600	8	–	4	.667
Wisconsin	5	–	4	.556	8	–	4	.667
Illinois	5	–	6	.455	7	–	6	.538
Minnesota	3	–	6	.333	8	–	6	.571
Indiana	2	–	6	.250	5	–	9	.357
Northwestern	1	–	4	.200	1	–	7	.125
Iowa	1	–	5	.167	8	–	7	.533

=== Independents ===
A total of 113 college teams played as major independents. Among independents that played at least 10 games, California (10–0), New York University (13–0), Swarthmore (12–0), and Whittier (14–0) were undefeated, and Notre Dame (33–7) finished with the most wins.

1908–09 IAAUS men's basketball independents standings
	Conf.				Overall
Team	W		L	PCT	W		L	PCT
California		–		–	10	–	0	1.000
Illinois State		–		–	9	–	0	1.000
New Mexico		–		–	1	–	0	1.000
New York University		–		–	13	–	0	1.000
Swarthmore		–		–	12	–	0	1.000
Whittier		–		–	14	–	0	1.000
Widener		–		–	9	–	0	1.000
Columbia		–		–	15	–	1	.938
Williams		–		–	13	–	1	.929
Grinnell		–		–	12	–	1	.923
Ohio State		–		–	11	–	1	.917
Oregon Agricultural		–		–	10	–	1	.909
Trinity (N.C.)		–		–	8	–	1	.889
Hope		–		–	8	–	1	.889
Montana State		–		–	8	–	1	.889
Dayton		–		–	12	–	2	.857
Wake Forest		–		–	6	–	1	.857
Allegheny		–		–	11	–	2	.846
North Dakota		–		–	10	–	2	.833
Washington		–		–	5	–	1	.833
Wooster		–		–	10	–	2	.833
Notre Dame		–		–	33	–	7	.825
Army		–		–	9	–	2	.818
Nebraska Wesleyan		–		–	11	–	3	.786
New Mexico A&M		–		–	7	–	2	.778
Rhode Island A&M		–		–	7	–	2	.778
Pennsylvania		–		–	19	–	6	.760
Bucknell		–		–	9	–	3	.750
Wabash		–		–	9	–	3	.750
North Dakota Agricultural		–		–	11	–	4	.733
CCNY		–		–	8	–	3	.727
Navy		–		–	8	–	3	.727
Southern California		–		–	8	–	3	.727
Temple		–		–	8	–	3	.727
Butler		–		–	5	–	2	.714
Seton Hall		–		–	10	–	4	.714
Loyola (Md.)		–		–	12	–	5	.706
St. Lawrence		–		–	12	–	2	.857
Maine		–		–	7	–	3	.700
Marietta		–		–	7	–	3	.700
William & Mary		–		–	7	–	3	.700
Baylor		–		–	11	–	5	.688
Dartmouth		–		–	11	–	5	.688
Kansas State		–		–	6	–	3	.667
Michigan State		–		–	10	–	5	.667
Southwestern (Kan.)		–		–	6	–	3	.667
Texas		–		–	6	–	3	.667
Virginia		–		–	6	–	3	.667
Virginia Tech		–		–	4	–	2	.667
Denison		–		–	11	–	6	.647
Georgetown		–		–	9	–	5	.643
Brigham Young		–		–	7	–	4	.636
MIT		–		–	10	–	6	.625
Washington State		–		–	10	–	6	.625
Cincinnati		–		–	6	–	4	.600
Grove City		–		–	9	–	6	.600
St. John's (NY)		–		–	9	–	6	.600
Colorado		–		–	4	–	3	.571
Franklin		–		–	12	–	9	.571
Santa Clara		–		–	4	–	3	.571
Cornell		–		–	13	–	10	.565
Kentucky		–		–	5	–	4	.556
Washington and Lee		–		–	5	–	4	.556
Bloomsburg		–		–	6	–	5	.545
Washburn		–		–	6	–	5	.545
Colgate		–		–	7	–	6	.538
Penn State		–		–	7	–	6	.538
Fordham		–		–	13	–	12	.520
Arizona		–		–	1	–	1	.500
Lehigh		–		–	5	–	5	.500
Ohio		–		–	1	–	1	.500
Oklahoma		–		–	3	–	3	.500
VMI		–		–	3	–	3	.500
Wisconsin–Stevens Point		–		–	4	–	4	.500
Wyoming		–		–	3	–	3	.500
Yale		–		–	9	–	9	.500
Syracuse		–		–	7	–	8	.467
Akron		–		–	6	–	7	.462
Bradley		–		–	6	–	7	.462
Gettysburg		–		–	4	–	5	.444
Wesleyan (Conn.)		–		–	7	–	9	.438
Canisius		–		–	3	–	4	.429
Idaho		–		–	7	–	10	.412
Miami (Ohio)		–		–	4	–	6	.400
Westminster (Pa.)		–		–	4	–	6	.400
Fairmount		–		–	4	–	6	.400
Mount Union		–		–	7	–	11	.389
Princeton		–		–	8	–	13	.381
Denver		–		–	6	–	10	.375
Delaware		–		–	4	–	7	.364
Brown		–		–	5	–	10	.333
Davidson		–		–	1	–	2	.333
Holy Cross		–		–	4	–	8	.333
Lake Forest		–		–	3	–	6	.333
Oklahoma A&M		–		–	1	–	2	.333
Tulane		–		–	3	–	7	.300
Manhattan		–		–	4	–	10	.286
Springfield (Mass.)		–		–	2	–	5	.286
Utah		–		–	3	–	8	.273
Indiana State		–		–	2	–	7	.222
Niagara		–		–	2	–	7	.222
Trinity (Conn.)		–		–	2	–	7	.222
Union (N.Y.)		–		–	2	–	8	.200
Harvard		–		–	1	–	7	.125
Utah State		–		–	1	–	8	.111
Kalamazoo		–		–	0	–	3	.000
South Carolina		–		–	0	–	3	.000

== Awards ==
=== Helms College Basketball All-Americans ===
The practice of selecting a Consensus All-American Team did not begin until the 1928–29 season. The Helms Athletic Foundation later retroactively selected a list of All-Americans for the 1908–09 season.

Player	Team
Biaggio Cerussi	Columbia
Julian Hayward	Wesleyan (Conn.)
Tommy Johnson	Kansas
Charles Keinath	Penn
Ted Kiendl	Columbia
Pat Page	Chicago
John Ryan	Columbia
Raymond Scanlon	Notre Dame
John Schommer	Chicago
Helmer Swenholt	Wisconsin

=== Major player of the year awards ===
- Helms Player of the Year: John Schommer, Chicago (retroactive selection in 1944)

== Coaching changes ==
A number of teams changed coaches during the season and after it ended.

Team	Former Coach	Interim Coach	New Coach	Reason
Akron	Dwight Bradley		Clarence Weed	
Brown	J. Donald Pryor		Walter White	
Butler	Jack McKay		Walter Gipe	
Canisius	John Mahoney		Charles McCabe	
Cincinnati	Amos Foster		C. A. Shroetter	
Cornell	Walter Haggerty		David Coogan	
Drake	Charles Pell		John L. Griffith	
Fordham	Chris Mahoney		Edward Siskind	
Indiana	Robert Harris		John Georgen	
Indiana State	Eddy Conners		John Kimmell	
Kansas	Phog Allen		W. O. Hamilton	
Manhattan	John O'Donnell		Edward Hanrahan	
Nebraska	R. G. Clapp		T. J. Hewitt	
New Mexico A&M	V. Kays		George Lain	
Niagara	Robert Yates		Claude Allen	
North Dakota Agricultural	Paul Magoffin		Arthur Rueber	
Penn	R. B. Smith		Charles Keinath	
Purdue	E. J. Stewart		Ralph Jones	
St. John's	P. Joseph Kersey		Harry A. Fisher	
Seton Hall	William Caffrey		Dick McDonough	
South Carolina	J. H. Brown		F. E. Schofield	
TCU	Jesse R. Langley		Oscar Wise	
Utah	Erastus Milne		Robert Richardson	
Vanderbilt	Ed Hamilton		R. B. McGehee	Hamilton left to coach the baseball team.
Virginia Tech	R. M. Brown		Branch Bocock	
VMI	Pete Krebs		F. J. Pratt	
Wyoming	Elmer Hoefer		Harold I. Dean	
