= 1921–22 NCAA men's basketball season =

Men's collegiate basketball season

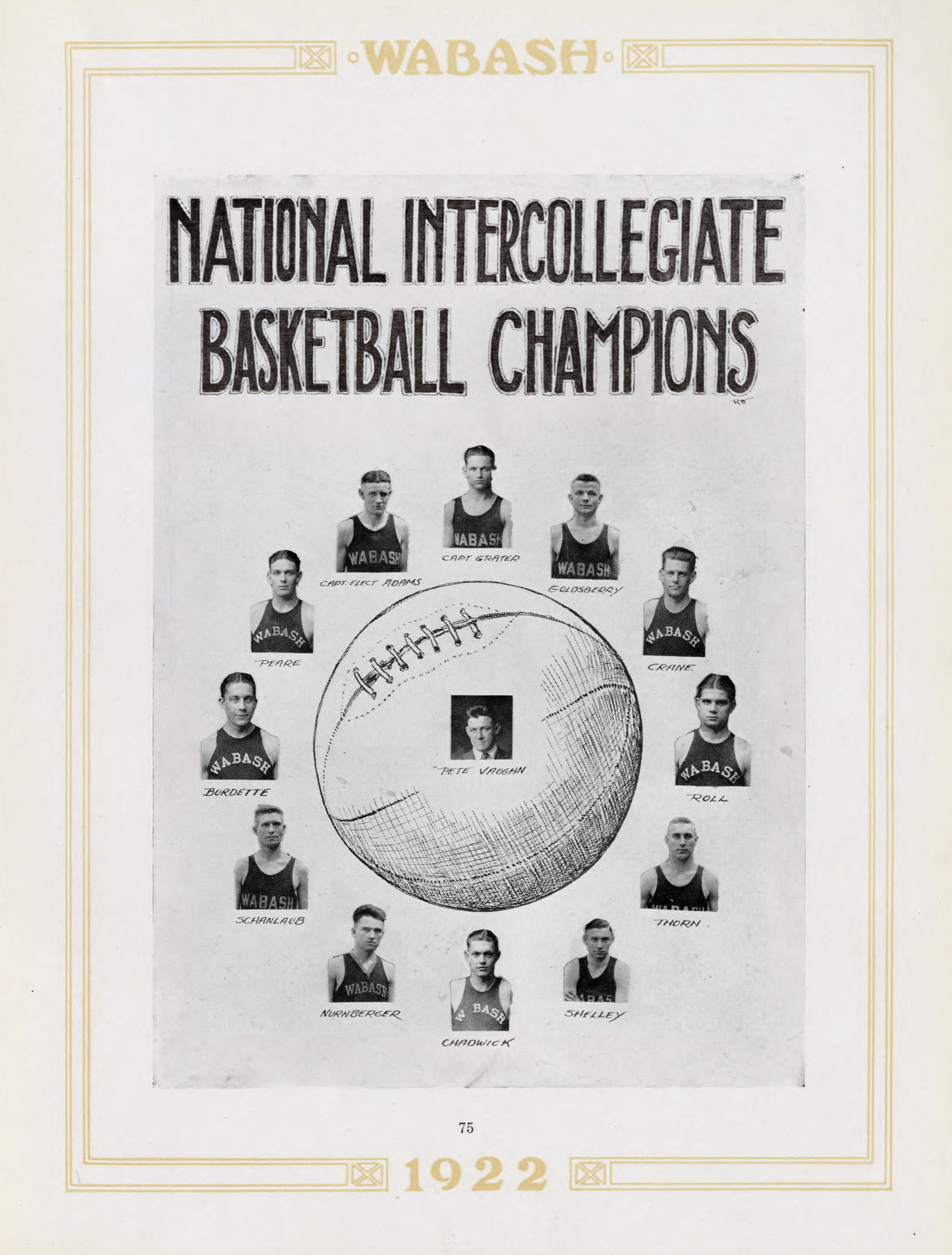
- Wabash College won the season-ending National Intercollegiate Basketball Tournament
- Helms National Champions: Kansas (retroactive selection in 1943)
- Player of the Year (Helms): Chuck Carney, Illinois (retroactive selection in 1944)

The 1921–22 NCAA men's basketball season began in December 1921, progressed through the regular season and conference tournaments, and concluded in March 1922.

== Rule changes ==
Running with the ball (traveling), previously a personal foul, became merely a violation.

== Season headlines ==
- The Southern Conference began play with 14 original members, 13 of which had major basketball programs during the 1921–22 season.
- The first national basketball championship tournament, the 1922 National Intercollegiate Basketball Tournament, took place in Indianapolis, Indiana, from March 9 to 11, 1922. The Eastern Intercollegiate Basketball League and Big Ten Conference declined invitations to participate, but six schools representing six other conferences took part. Wabash won and claimed the national championship. The tournament was not held again.
- In February 1943, the Helms Athletic Foundation retroactively selected Kansas as its national champion for the 1921–22 season.
- In 1995, the Premo-Porretta Power Poll retroactively selected Missouri as its top-ranked team for the 1921–22 season.

== Conference membership changes ==
School	Former Conference	New Conference
Alabama Crimson Tide	Southern Intercollegiate Athletic Association	Southern Conference
Auburn Tigers	Southern Intercollegiate Athletic Association	Southern Conference
Clemson Tigers	Southern Intercollegiate Athletic Association	Southern Conference
Georgia Bulldogs	Southern Intercollegiate Athletic Association	Southern Conference
Georgia Tech Yellow Jackets	Southern Intercollegiate Athletic Association	Southern Conference
Idaho Vandals	Independent	Pacific Coast Conference
Mississippi A&M Aggies	Southern Intercollegiate Athletic Association	Southern Conference
North Carolina Tar Heels	Independent	Southern Conference
North Carolina State Wolfpack	Independent	Southern Conference
Oklahoma A&M Aggies	Independent	Southwest Conference
USC Trojans	Independent	Pacific Coast Conference
Tennessee Volunteers	Southern Intercollegiate Athletic Association	Southern Conference
Virginia basketball team	Independent	Southern Conference
Virginia Tech Hokies	Independent	Southern Conference
Washington and Lee Generals	Independent	Southern Conference

NOTES: (1) The Southern Conference was founded in February 1921 during the 1920–21 season, but its first season of basketball competition was the 1921–22 season. (2) The University of Virginia did not adopt a nickname for its basketball team ("Cavaliers") until the 1923–24 season.

== Regular season ==
=== Conferences ===
==== Conference winners and tournaments ====
Conference	Regular Season Winner	Conference Player of the Year	Conference Tournament	Tournament Venue (City)	Tournament Winner
Big Ten Conference	Purdue	None selected	No Tournament		
Eastern Intercollegiate Basketball League	Princeton	None selected	No Tournament		
Missouri Valley Intercollegiate Athletic Association	Kansas & Missouri	None selected	No Tournament		
Pacific Coast Conference	Idaho		No Tournament		
Rocky Mountain Athletic Conference	Colorado College		No Tournament		
Southern Intercollegiate Athletic Association	Virginia	None selected	1922 Southern Intercollegiate men's basketball tournament (see note)	Municipal Auditorium (Atlanta, Georgia)	North Carolina
Southwest Conference	Texas A&M	None selected	No Tournament		

NOTE: The 1922 Southern Intercollegiate men's basketball tournament included teams from both the Southern Conference and the Southern Intercollegiate Athletic Association. Although it was a regional rather than conference tournament whose champion claimed the mythical title of "Champions of the South," the Southern Conference considered it the "official" Southern Conference tournament for 1922.

==== Conference standings ====
1921–22 Big Ten Conference men's basketball standings
	Conf.				Overall
Team	W		L	PCT	W		L	PCT
Purdue	8	–	1	.889	15	–	3	.833
Michigan	8	–	4	.667	15	–	4	.789
Wisconsin	8	–	4	.667	14	–	5	.737
Illinois	7	–	5	.583	14	–	5	.737
Iowa	5	–	6	.455	11	–	7	.611
Chicago	5	–	7	.417	15	–	15	.500
Ohio State	5	–	7	.417	8	–	10	.444
Minnesota	4	–	7	.364	5	–	8	.385
Indiana	3	–	7	.300	10	–	10	.500
Northwestern	3	–	9	.250	7	–	11	.389

1921–22 Eastern Intercollegiate Basketball League standings
	Conf.				Overall
Team	W		L	PCT	W		L	PCT
Princeton†	8	–	2	.800	20	–	5	.800
Penn	8	–	2	.800	24	–	3	.889
Dartmouth	6	–	4	.600	13	–	7	.650
Cornell	5	–	5	.500	14	–	5	.737
Columbia	2	–	8	.200	6	–	13	.316
Yale	1	–	9	.100	6	–	21	.222
† Conference championship winner

1921–22 Missouri Valley Intercollegiate Athletic Association men's basketball standings
	Conf.				Overall
Team	W		L	PCT	W		L	PCT
Missouri	15	–	1	.938	16	–	1	.941
Kansas	15	–	1	.938	16	–	2	.889
Drake	12	–	4	.750	14	–	4	.778
Iowa State	8	–	8	.500	10	–	8	.556
Oklahoma	8	–	8	.500	9	–	9	.500
Nebraska	8	–	8	.500	8	–	9	.471
Kansas State	3	–	13	.188	3	–	14	.176
Grinnell	2	–	14	.125	5	–	14	.263
Washington University	1	–	15	.063	1	–	18	.053

1921–22 Pacific Coast Conference men's basketball standings
	Conf.				Overall
Team	W		L	PCT	W		L	PCT
Idaho	7	–	0	1.000	19	–	2	.905
Oregon Agricultural	10	–	2	.833	21	–	2	.913
California	10	–	4	.714	19	–	6	.760
Washington	11	–	5	.688	13	–	5	.722
Stanford	4	–	6	.400	8	–	7	.533
Washington State	4	–	11	.267	9	–	17	.346
USC	1	–	3	.250	7	–	5	.583
Oregon	0	–	16	.000	7	–	24	.226
As of 1922

1921–22 Rocky Mountain Conference standings
	Conf.				Overall
Team	W		L	PCT	W		L	PCT
Colorado College	7	–	1	.875	13	–	2	.867
Colorado Mines	6	–	2	.750	8	–	2	.800
Colorado	3	–	5	.375	3	–	5	.375
Colorado Agricultural	2	–	6	.250	4	–	7	.364
Denver	2	–	6	.250	3	–	6	.333

1921–22 Southern Conference men's basketball standings
	Conf.				Overall
Team	W		L	PCT	W		L	PCT
Virginia	5	–	0	1.000	17	–	1	.944
Alabama	6	–	1	.857	15	–	4	.789
Georgia	4	–	1	.800	10	–	5	.667
Washington and Lee	6	–	2	.750	11	–	3	.786
Kentucky	3	–	1	.750	10	–	6	.625
Auburn	2	–	1	.667	5	–	6	.455
North Carolina †	3	–	3	.500	15	–	6	.714
Virginia Tech	2	–	2	.500	14	–	6	.700
Georgia Tech	2	–	3	.400	11	–	6	.647
Tennessee	1	–	3	.250	12	–	7	.632
NC State	1	–	5	.167	6	–	13	.316
Clemson	0	–	3	.000	8	–	13	.381
Mississippi A&M	0	–	4	.000	12	–	10	.545
† Southern Intercollegiate Tournament winner

1921–22 Southwest Conference men's basketball standings
	Conf.				Overall
Team	W		L	PCT	W		L	PCT
Texas A&M	13	–	3	.813	18	–	3	.857
Texas	14	–	4	.778	20	–	4	.833
Baylor	8	–	8	.500	10	–	8	.556
SMU	4	–	11	.267	8	–	14	.364
Oklahoma A&M	1	–	4	.200	5	–	16	.238
Rice	1	–	11	.083	2	–	12	.143

=== Independents ===
A total of 115 college teams played as major independents. Beloit (12–0) was undefeated and Niagara (27–4) finished with the most wins.

1921–22 NCAA men's basketball independents standings
	Conf.				Overall
Team	W		L	PCT	W		L	PCT
Beloit		–		–	12	–	0	1.000
Louisiana State		–		–	15	–	1	.938
Wooster		–		–	14	–	1	.933
North Texas State		–		–	11	–	1	.917
Tempe Normal		–		–	10	–	1	.909
UCLA		–		–	9	–	1	.900
Army		–		–	17	–	2	.895
Kalamazoo		–		–	22	–	3	.880
Carleton		–		–	14	–	2	.875
Seton Hall		–		–	14	–	2	.875
Wabash		–		–	21	–	3	.875
Niagara		–		–	27	–	4	.871
DePauw		–		–	17	–	3	.850
Washington College		–		–	11	–	2	.846
Navy		–		–	16	–	3	.842
Arizona		–		–	10	–	2	.833
CCNY		–		–	10	–	2	.833
Rutgers		–		–	10	–	2	.833
Ohio		–		–	19	–	4	.826
Holy Cross		–		–	14	–	3	.824
North Dakota Agricultural		–		–	17	–	4	.810
Creighton		–		–	21	–	5	.808
Grove City		–		–	16	–	4	.800
Indiana State		–		–	12	–	3	.800
Utah		–		–	8	–	2	.800
Southwestern (Kan.)		–		–	19	–	5	.792
Connecticut		–		–	15	–	4	.789
Vermont		–		–	15	–	4	.789
Georgetown		–		–	11	–	3	.786
Tulsa		–		–	14	–	4	.778
Davidson		–		–	10	–	3	.769
William & Mary		–		–	10	–	3	.769
Butler		–		–	19	–	6	.760
Brigham Young		–		–	9	–	3	.750
Marquette		–		–	15	–	5	.750
West Texas State		–		–	12	–	4	.750
Fairmount		–		–	12	–	4	.750
Western Kentucky State		–		–	3	–	1	.750
Harvard		–		–	17	–	6	.739
Villanova		–		–	11	–	4	.733
Springfield (Mass.)		–		–	16	–	6	.727
Utah State		–		–	8	–	3	.727
Santa Clara		–		–	13	–	5	.722
Richmond		–		–	10	–	4	.714
Saint Francis (N.Y.)		–		–	15	–	7	.682
Valparaiso		–		–	15	–	7	.682
Colgate		–		–	17	–	8	.680
Bradley		–		–	12	–	6	.667
Gettysburg		–		–	12	–	6	.667
Montana		–		–	14	–	7	.667
North Central		–		–	12	–	6	.667
Syracuse		–		–	16	–	8	.667
Texas Christian		–		–	8	–	4	.667
Cincinnati		–		–	15	–	8	.652
Fordham		–		–	13	–	7	.650
Miami (Ohio)		–		–	13	–	7	.650
Lafayette		–		–	11	–	6	.647
Wake Forest		–		–	11	–	6	.647
Western State Normal		–		–	11	–	6	.647
Penn State		–		–	9	–	5	.643
Ole Miss		–		–	7	–	4	.636
Duquesne		–		–	10	–	6	.625
New York University		–		–	8	–	5	.615
VMI		–		–	11	–	7	.611
Canisius		–		–	6	–	4	.600
Denison		–		–	9	–	6	.600
Pittsburgh		–		–	12	–	8	.600
Ripon		–		–	7	–	5	.583
Catholic		–		–	11	–	8	.579
Montana State		–		–	11	–	8	.579
George Washington		–		–	8	–	6	.571
Brown		–		–	13	–	10	.565
Marshall		–		–	5	–	4	.556
St. Bonaventure		–		–	12	–	10	.545
The Citadel		–		–	6	–	5	.545
Mount Union		–		–	11	–	7	.611
Furman		–		–	8	–	7	.533
Muhlenberg		–		–	10	–	9	.526
Florida		–		–	5	–	5	.500
Franklin		–		–	8	–	8	.500
Northern Arizona Normal		–		–	5	–	5	.500
Vanderbilt		–		–	8	–	8	.500
Washburn		–		–	10	–	10	.500
Xavier		–		–	9	–	9	.500
Michigan State Normal		–		–	11	–	12	.478
St. John's (N.Y.)		–		–	10	–	11	.476
Tulane		–		–	10	–	11	.476
Union (N.Y.)		–		–	9	–	10	.474
St. Joseph's		–		–	8	–	9	.471
Rhode Island State		–		–	7	–	8	.467
Toledo		–		–	5	–	6	.455
Bucknell		–		–	8	–	10	.444
Lehigh		–		–	7	–	9	.438
Dayton		–		–	6	–	8	.429
Loyola (Md.)		–		–	3	–	4	.429
New Mexico A&M		–		–	3	–	4	.429
Buffalo		–		–	5	–	7	.417
Akron		–		–	5	–	8	.385
West Virginia		–		–	8	–	13	.381
Manhattan		–		–	3	–	5	.375
South Carolina		–		–	7	–	12	.368
Temple		–		–	4	–	7	.364
Trinity (N.C.)		–		–	6	–	12	.333
Notre Dame		–		–	6	–	13	.316
Saint Louis		–		–	4	–	9	.308
Bowling Green State		–		–	4	–	10	.286
Kent State Normal		–		–	2	–	6	.250
Northern Colorado		–		–	1	–	3	.250
Wyoming		–		–	2	–	7	.222
Detroit		–		–	2	–	13	.133
Louisville		–		–	1	–	13	.071
Boston University		–		–	1	–	14	.067
Loyola (Ill.)		–		–	0	–	6	.000
New Mexico		–		–	0	–	2	.000
Saint Mary's (Calif.)		–		–	0	–	4	.000

== Post-season tournament ==
=== National Intercollegiate Basketball Tournament ===
==== Semifinals & finals ====
Semifinals
Mercer	25
Wabash	62
Grove City	13
Kalamazoo	22

Finals
Wabash	43
Kalamazoo	23

== Awards ==
=== Helms College Basketball All-Americans ===
The practice of selecting a Consensus All-American Team did not begin until the 1928–29 season. The Helms Athletic Foundation later retroactively selected a list of All-Americans for the 1921–22 season.

Player	Team
Arthur Browning	Missouri
Herb Bunker	Missouri
Chuck Carney	Illinois
Paul Endacott	Kansas
George Gardner	Southwestern (Kan.)
William Grave	Pennsylvania
Marshall Hjelte	Oregon Agricultural
Arthur Lorb	Princeton
Ira McKee	Navy
Ray Miller	Purdue

=== Major player of the year awards ===
- Helms Player of the Year: Chuck Carney, Illinois (retroactive selection in 1944)

== Coaching changes ==
A number of teams changed coaches during the season and after it ended.

Team	Former Coach	Interim Coach	New Coach	Reason
Tempe Normal	George E. Cooper		Ernest C. Wills	Cooper left to coach at Northern Colorado.
Bowling Green	Earl Krieger		Allen Snyder	
Davidson	Fred Hengeveld		H. M. Grey	
Dayton	William Sherry		Van F. Hill	
Connecticut	J. Wilder Tasker		Roy J. Guyer	
Creighton	Charles Kearney		Arthur Schabinger	
Detroit	James M. Brown		Paul Harbrecht	
Florida	William G. Kline		Check Byrd	
Fordham	Eli Butler		Bud Culloton & Ed Kelleher	
Georgetown	James Colliflower		Jackie Maloney	Colliflower had taken over as unpaid head coach when health problems forced coach John O'Reilly to miss the 1921–22 season. With O'Reilly also unable to return for the following season, Maloney took over from Colliflower after the end of the 1921–22 season.
Illinois	Frank Winters		J. Craig Ruby	
Indiana	George Levis		Leslie Mann	
Iowa	James N. Ashmore		Sam Barry	
Kansas State	E. C. Curtis		Charlie Corsaut	
Lehigh	Ray Fisher		James A. Baldwin	
Loyola (Md.)	William Schuerholz		Stan Cook	
Loyola (Ill.)	Harry Rhode		Jack Tierney	
Manhattan	Edward P. Winters		Arthur T. Carroll	
Marshall	Herbert Cramer		J. E. R. Barnes	
Miami (Ohio)	George Little		Harry W. Ewing	
Michigan State	Lyman Frimodig		Mysterious Walker	
Missouri	J. Craig Ruby		George Bond	Ruby left to coach at Illinois
Montana	Bernie Bierman		John W. Stewart	
Navy	Billy Lush		James Allen	
New Mexico A&M	Dutch Bergman		R. R. Brown	
North Dakota Agricultural	Stanley Borleske		George Dewey	
Northern Colorado	William E. Search		George E. Cooper	
Northwestern	Dana Evans		Maury Kent	Evans stepped down as basketball coach and continued to be athletic director.
Ohio	Russ Finsterwald		Butch Grover	
Ohio State	George Trautman		Harold Olsen	
Oregon Agricultural	Dick Rutherford		Robert Hager	
Pittsburgh	Andrew Kerr		Doc Carlson	Kerr left to coach at Stanford.
Rice	Howard Yerges Sr.		Philip Arbuckle	
Saint Louis	Stephen G. O'Rourke		Dan J. Savage	
SMU	R. N. Blackwell		H. A. Faulkner	
South Carolina	Lana A. Sims		Jack Crawford	
St. John's (N. Y.)	Ed Kelleher		John Crenny	
Stanford	Eugene Van Gent		Andrew Kerr	
Texas Christian	William L. Driver		John McKnight	
Texas	L. Theo Bellmont		Milton Romney	
Trinity (N. C.)	James A. Baldwin		Jessie Burbage	
Tulsa	Francis Schmidt		Howard Archer	
USC	Willis O. Hunter		Les Turner	
Valparaiso	George Keogan		Earl Goheen	
VMI	Pinky Spruhan		W. C. Raftery	
Wake Forest	Bill Holding		Phil Utley	
Western Kentucky State	L. T. Smith		Edgar Diddle	
Western State Normal	William H. Spaulding		Buck Read	Spaulding left to coach football at Minnesota.
Yale	Orson Kinney		Joe Fogarty	
