= List of Chicago Maroons men's basketball head coaches =

The following is a list of Chicago Maroons men's basketball head coaches. The Chicago Maroons men's basketball team has had 11 head coaches. The current coach is Mike McGrath.

| Coach | Years | Conference Record | Winning Pct | Overall Record | Winning Pct | Conference Titles | NCAA Division III Tournaments | National Championships |
| Horace Butterworth | 1895–1897 | 0–0 | | 10–4 | .714 | 0 | – | 0 |
| Wilfred Childs | 1903–1906 | 3–5 | .375 | 21–8 | .724 | 0 | – | 0 |
| Joseph Raycroft | 1906–1910 | 34–5 | .872 | 66–7 | .904 | 4 | – | 3 |
| John Schommer | 1910–1911 | 7–5 | .583 | 13–5 | .722 | 0 | – | 0 |
| Harlan Page | 1911–1920 | 66–42 | .611 | 161–76 | .679 | 1 | – | 0 |
| Amos Alonzo Stagg | 1920–1921 | 6–6 | .500 | 14–6 | .700 | 0 | – | 0 |
| Nelson Norgren | 1921–1942 | 52–203 | .203 | 120–272 | .306 | 0 | 0 | 0 |
| J. Kyle Anderson | 1942–1944 | 0–17 | .000 | 1–40 | .024 | 0 | 0 | 0 |
| Nelson Norgren | 1944–1957 | 0-12 | .000 | 65–147 | .307 | 0 | 0 | 0 |
| Joseph Stampf | 1957–1975 | * | .000 | 208–118 | .638 | * | 0 | 0 |
| John Angelus | 1975–1991 | 65–117 | .357 | 146–177 | .452 | 0 | 0 | 0 |
| Pat Cunningham | 1991–1999 | 62–50 | .554 | 115–91 | .558 | 2 | 2 | 0 |
| Mike McGrath | 1999–present | 201-137 | .595 | 327–240 | .577 | 4 | 5 | 0 |
| Totals | 11 coaches | 496-599 | (.453) | 1,267–1,191 | (.515) | 11 | 7 | 3 |

- The National Invitation Tournament began in 1938.
- The NCAA Men's Division I Basketball Championship began in 1939.
- The NCAA Men's Division III Basketball Championship began in 1975.

*Chicago left the Big Ten Conference at the conclusion of the 1945-46 season. They joined the Midwest Conference in 1976, followed by entering the University Athletic Association in 1987.
