= 1921–22 Princeton Tigers men's basketball team =

American college basketball season

1921–22 Princeton Tigers men's basketball

EIBL Champions

EIBL one-game playoff, Won
- Conference: Eastern Intercollegiate Basketball League
- Record: 20–5 (9–2 EIBL)
- Head coach: Hill Zahn
- Captain: Albert Wittmer
- Home arena: University Gymnasium

The 1921–22 Princeton Tigers men's basketball team represented Princeton University in intercollegiate college basketball during the 1921–22 NCAA men's basketball season. The head coach was Hill Zahn and the team captain was Albert Wittmer. The team played its home games in the University Gymnasium on the university campus in Princeton, New Jersey. The team was the winner of the Eastern Intercollegiate Basketball League (EIBL).

The team posted a 20–5 overall record and a 9–2 conference record. The team lost three of its first six games, including two to City College of New York. After ending the regular season tied for the conference lead, the team won a one-game playoff against the Penn Quakers on March 28, 1922, at home by a 28–23 margin for the EIBL championship. The team earned the school's first conference championship.

The team was led by All-American Arthur Loeb. who repeated as an All-American the following season. Loeb was the school's second two-time All-American (Cyril Haas, 1915–16 & 1916–17). Bill Bradley became the only other Princeton Tiger to equal (and later surpass) this accomplishment.

Loeb set numerous records, including the school record for single-season free throws made (203) that surpassed Hamilton Salmon total of 142 set during the 1912–13 season and that would stand until Bill Bradley totaled 258 during his 1962–63 season; the school record for single-game free throws made (16) on January 10, 1922, against the CCNY Beavers and rebroken with 18 on March 18 against the Penn Quakers that would stand until Bradley made 21 on January 19, 1963, against the Cornell Big Red.
