= 1909 NCAA Men's Basketball All-Americans =

- Awarded for: 1908–09 IAAUS men's basketball season

The 1909 College Basketball All-American team, as chosen retroactively by the Helms Athletic Foundation. The player highlighted in gold was chosen as the Helms Foundation College Basketball Player of the Year retroactively in 1944.

Player	Team
Biaggio Cerussi	Columbia
Julian Hayward	Wesleyan (Conn.)
Tommy Johnson	Kansas
Charles Keinath	Penn
Ted Kiendl	Columbia
Pat Page	Chicago
John Ryan	Columbia
Raymond Scanlon	Notre Dame
John Schommer	Chicago
Helmer Swenholt	Wisconsin

== See also ==
- 1908–09 IAAUS men's basketball season
