= Hill Zahn =

American basketball coach (1893–1957)

Biographical details
- Born: June 11, 1893; Philadelphia, Pennsylvania, U.S.
- Died: October 7, 1957 (aged 64); Charlotte, North Carolina, U.S.

Coaching career (HC unless noted)
- 1921–1923: Princeton

Head coaching record
- Overall: 36–9 (.800)

Accomplishments and honors

Championships
- 1x Eastern Intercollegiate Basketball League championship (1922)

Josiah Hillman "Hill" Zahn (June 11, 1893 – October 7, 1957) was an American basketball coach who was the head coach of the Princeton Tigers men's basketball team from 1921 to 1923.

== Early life ==
Zahn attended the Friends Select School and Benjamin Franklin Institute. In 1910, he joined the H.W. Butterworth and Sons Company as a draftsman, but later moved into sales. During this time, he also played professional basketball in Philadelphia.

== Coaching ==
Zahn was the head basketball coach at Princeton from 1921 to 1923. During his tenure, the Tigers had a 36–9 record and were the 1921–22 champions of the Eastern Intercollegiate Basketball League. During this time, Zahn's brother, George Zahn, was the head coach of conference rival Dartmouth.

== Later life ==
In 1923, Zahn left coaching to return to Butterworth. He and J. Ebert Butterworth opened the company's Southern office in Greenville, South Carolina. The office was moved to Charlotte, North Carolina in 1926 and Zahn became manager of the office in 1936. He retired in 1956. Zahn died suddenly on October 7, 1957 in Charlotte.
