= FABD =

FABD may refer to:

- Florida Association of Band Directors
- (acyl-carrier-protein) S-malonyltransferase, an enzyme
- Football Association of Brunei Darussalam
