= Hengeveld =

Hengeveld is a surname. Notable people with the surname include:

- Fred Hengeveld (1897–1969), American college sports coach
- Gerard Hengeveld (1910–2001), Dutch pianist, composer, and educationalist
- Johannes Hengeveld (1894–1961), Dutch Olympic athlete
- Kees Hengeveld (born 1957), Dutch linguist

== See also ==
- Hengevelde
