= 1893–94 Chicago Maroons men's basketball team =

American college basketball season

1893–94 Chicago Maroons men's basketball
- Conference: Independent
- Record: 6–1
- Head coach: None
- Captain: Henry D. Hubbard
- Home arena: Men's Gymnasium

The 1893–94 Chicago Maroons men's basketball team represented the University of Chicago in intercollegiate basketball and was the first basketball team in the university's history. The team finished the season with a 6–1 record. The team played their home games on campus in the Men's Gymnasium.

The team consisted of nine players; Henry David Hubbard, Henry Magee Adkinson, Sidney Charles Liebenstein, Charles King Bliss, Stanley M. Ramsay, William B. Keen Jr., Clifford Bottsford McGillivray, Frederick Day Nichols, and Harry Victor Church. The Maroons did not list a head coach on their roster; however, Hubbard was appointed team captain.

== Roster ==
1893–94 Chicago Maroons men's basketball team
Players
Coaches

Pos.	#	Name	Height	Weight	Year	Hometown
F		Henry Hubbard (C)	—	—		Philadelphia, PA
G		Henry Adkinson	—	—		Chicago, IL
C		Sidney Liebenstein	—	—		Chicago, IL
C		Charles Bliss	—	—		Longwood, IL
G		Stanley Ramsay	—	—		Chicago, IL
C		William Keen Jr.	—	—		Chicago, IL
F		Clifford McGillivray	—	—		Chicago, IL
F		Frederick Nichols	—	—		Osage, IA
F		Harry Church	—	—		Morrison, IL

Head coach

- No coach listed

Assistant coach(es)

Legend

- (C) Team captain
- (S) Suspended
- (I) Ineligible
- (W) Walk-on
- Injured
- Current redshirt

The Cap and Gown Roster

== Schedule ==
Date time, TV	Opponent	Result	Record	Site city, state
1/27/1894* no	YMCA Training School	W 19–11	1-0	Men's Gymnasium; Chicago, IL
2/1/1894* no	YMCA Training School	W 17–11	2–0	Men's Gymnasium; Chicago, IL
2/10/1894* no	Morgan Park Academy	W 20–11	3–0	Men's Gymnasium; Chicago, IL
2/17/1894* no	Pullman YMCA	W 22–6	4–0	Men's Gymnasium; Chicago, IL
3/3/1894* no	Central YMCA	L 13–15	4–1	Men's Gymnasium; Chicago, IL
3/10/1894* no	Morgan Park Academy	W 10–8	5–1	Men's Gymnasium; Chicago, IL
3/12/1894* no	Englewood YMCA	W 20–17	6–1	Men's Gymnasium; Chicago, IL
*Non-conference game. ^{#}Rankings from AP Poll. (#) Tournament seedings in parentheses. All times are in Central Time.
