= Florida Association of Band Directors =

The Florida Association of Band Directors (FABD) was an organization dedicated to provide the music schools of predominantly black colleges in Florida, United States, with a feeder system from 1941 until 1966, when the organization merged with the Florida Bandmasters Association (FBA).

== History ==
Prior to 1940 and two years thereafter, there were no programs in the public schools of Florida offering instrumental music to the African-American children in those schools. As a result, the schools of higher education (such as Florida A&M College, Edward Waters College, Bethune-Cookman College, and Florida Memorial College) had no feeder programs for the development of bands.

In 1941, Leander A. Kirksey (band and orchestra director) and J. Harold Brown (director of the music department at Florida A&M College) called a meeting of several young graduates from the music department of Florida A&M College. George Hill (employed at Crooms Academy in Sanford), Alvin Downing (employed at Gibbs High School in St. Petersburg), Raymond Sheppard (employed at Booker T. Washington High in Pensacola), Michael Rodriguez (employed at Booker T. Washington Jr. High in Tampa), and Guy Glover (employed at Dorsey High School in Broward) met on April 10–12, 1941 to organize an association whose chief purpose would be to provide feeders for the instrumental program at Florida A&M and other predominantly black colleges in Florida. The association was named the Florida Association of Band Directors.

Its membership grew to more than thirty band directors, teaching several thousand students. It was merged with the FBA in 1966.

=== Past presidents of the FABD ===
- Leander Kirksey, 1941–1955
- George H. Hill, 1955–1960
- James W. Wilson, 1960–1966
