= Chicago Maroons men's basketball =

- University: University of Chicago
- Head coach: Mike McGrath (17th season)
- Location: Chicago
- Arena: Ratner Athletics Center (capacity: 1,658)
- Conference: University Athletic Association (UAA)
- Nickname: Maroons
- Colors: Maroon and white

NCAA Division I tournament Elite Eight
- Division III: 2001, 2026

NCAA Division I tournament appearances
- Division III: 1997, 1998, 2000, 2001, 2007, 2008, 2025, 2026

Intercollegiate national champions
- 1908

Pre-tournament Helms national champions
- 1907, 1908, 1909

Conference regular-season champions
- Big Ten: 1907, 1908, 1909, 1910, 1920, 1924; UAA: 1997, 1998, 2000, 2001, 2007, 2008

The Chicago Maroons men's basketball team is an NCAA Division III college basketball team competing in the University Athletic Association. Home games are played at the Gerald Ratner Athletics Center, located on the University of Chicago's campus in Chicago.

The team's head coach is currently Mike McGrath.

== Team history ==
The Maroons history in basketball dates to the 1893–94 season in which an organized team representing the university played a schedule of games primarily against YMCA opponents. They continued this type of schedule into the following season, without a head coach. However, during the 1895–96 season the team added a head coach named Horace Butterworth. Butterworth led the Maroons through two winning seasons and finished his tenure with 10 wins and only 4 losses before leaving Chicago to take on the role of athletic director and head baseball coach at Northwestern. The most notable event during the 1895–96 season for the Maroons was being a part of the first five-on-five college basketball game played in United States history. The game was played at Iowa City with the Maroons finishing victorious by a score of 15–12.

After the 1896–97 season, based on a lack of material and disinterest by participants, the university suspended its men's basketball program and promoted the women's program instead. Finally, in 1903 the program was reinstated and, with the Western Conference backing a conference champion, a varsity schedule was developed by athletic director Stagg. Wilfred Childs became the head coach of the Maroons for this newly developed team that finished the season with seven wins and zero losses, beating teams by an average score of 45–11. Childs would coach the Maroons through the 1905–06 season, turning the position over to Joseph Raycroft who would guide the team to four Big Ten Conference championships (then known as the Western Conference), and 1907, 1908, and 1909 teams were all retroactively named national champions by the Helms Athletic Foundation; his 1909 team was also retroactively ranked as the season's top team by the Premo-Porretta Power Poll.

=== Intercollegiate national championship ===
In March 1908, Pennsylvania, champion of the Eastern Intercollegiate Basketball League, issued a challenge to the Western Conference to meet its champion in the post-season to determine the national champion. Chicago and Wisconsin finished the regular season tied for first place in the Western Conference. Representatives of the schools agreed to stage a single game to break the tie and determine which team would play Penn for the national championship. Wisconsin won a coin flip for the right to host the game.

Chicago defeated Wisconsin, 18–16, on March 12, 1908, in front of 1,800 spectators at the Red Gym in Madison. After the Maroons took a 9–7 halftime lead, the Badgers surged in front briefly in the second half, before Chicago seized control of the game. Senior captain John Schommer and junior Robert Harris tallied five points apiece, each scoring one basket and sinking three free throws, to lead the Maroons. Frederick Falls added four points, all on free throws, for Chicago. Biddy Rogers, Wiconsin's senior captain, scored six points, all from the charity stripe, to lead the Badgers, but he missed seven of his 13 attempts. Visiting Chicago fans stormed the court after the game and carried the Maroons players to the locker room.

The best-of-three national championship series was scheduled to begin at the teams' on-campus gyms in Chicago on March 21, and in Philadelphia on March 25. If necessary, the third game was to be played on Columbia's home court in New York on March 28. The first ever postseason games to determine a national champion attracted interest across the United States, and basketball critics generally agreed that the teams were worthy representatives of the eastern and western parts of the country.

A crowd of 1,800, thought to be the largest ever to attend a basketball tilt in the west, witnessed the first game of the intercollegiate national championship series at Bartlett Gymnasium. With Pennsylvania leading, 12–10, in the first half, Frederick Falls passed the ball to John Schommer, who had his back to the basket about 20 feet behind him. Schomer, without turning around, lifted the ball over his head and shot the ball through the rim, tying the game. The score was deadlocked at 13 at halftime. With the Maroons trailing, 17–16, in the second half, Schommer scored two baskets from long-range, sparking a decisive 5–0 run. Chicago held the Quakers to just a free throw the rest of the way and secured a 21–18 victory. Schommer finished with eight points, and Falls led the Maroons with 11 points but shot only 7 for 15 from the free-throw line. Charles Keinath shot 12 for 14 from the charity stripe and finished with a game-high 12 points for the Quakers.

The largest crowd ever to attend a basketball game in the city of Philadelphia witnessed a tight contest at Weightman Hall that neither team led by more than three points. Fierce guarding by Pat Page made it difficult for Quakers star Charles Keinath to get shots at the basket. Keinath committed 11 fouls in the game, mostly trying to escape Page. With the score tied at 15, Frederick Falls gave the Maroons a lead with a free throw. In the closing seconds, Keinath, who was visibly tired from being hounded by Page, missed a pair of free throws, and Chicago held on for a 16–15 victory and the national championship. Falls finished with a game-high 10 points, all from the free-throw line, to lead the Maroons. Keinath scored nine points for Pennsylvania.

== Championships ==
=== National championships ===
| Year | Coach | Event name/awarding body | Record |
|---|---|---|---|
| 1907 | Joseph Raycroft | Helms Athletic Foundation | 21–2 |
| 1908 | Joseph Raycroft | Intercollegiate national championship | 23–2 |
| 1908 | Joseph Raycroft | Helms Athletic Foundation | 23–2 |
| 1909 | Joseph Raycroft | Helms Athletic Foundation | 12–0 |
| National championships | | | 3 |

=== University Athletic Association championships ===
| Year | Coach | Overall record | UAA record |
|---|---|---|---|
| 1997 | Pat Cunningham | 23–5 | 13-1 |
| 1998 | Pat Cunningham | 24–3 | 14–0 |
| 2000 | Mike McGrath | 23–4 | 15–0 |
| 2001 | Mike McGrath | 24–4 | 14–1 |
| 2007 | Mike McGrath | 20–6 | 11–3 |
| 2008 | Mike McGrath | 18–8 | 11–3 |
| UAA regular-season championships | | | 6 |

=== Big Ten regular-season championships ===
| Year | Coach | Overall record | Big Ten record |
|---|---|---|---|
| 1907 § | Joseph Raycroft | 21–2 | 6-2 |
| 1908 §† | Joseph Raycroft | 23–2 | 7–1 |
| 1909 | Joseph Raycroft | 12–0 | 12–0 |
| 1910 | Joseph Raycroft | 10–3 | 9–3 |
| 1920 | Pat Page | 27–8 | 10–2 |
| 1924 § | Nelson Norgren | 10–7 | 8–4 |
| Big Ten regular-season championships | | | 6 |
§ – Conference co-champions † – Won tie-breaker playoff game to represent conference in intercollegiate national championship series

== Individual honors ==
=== Naismith Memorial Basketball Hall of Fame ===
The following 4 Maroons have been inducted into the Basketball Hall of Fame:

| Year | Player | Inducted as a |
|---|---|---|
| 1959 | John Schommer | Player |
| 1959 | Amos Alonzo Stagg | Contributor |
| 1961 | Harlan "Pat" Page | Player |
| 1965 | Paul "Tony" Hinkle | Contributor |

=== Consensus All-American ===
| Player | Year(s) |
|---|---|
| James Ozanne | 1905 |
| John Schommer | 1906, 1907, 1908, & 1909 |
| James McKeag | 1906 |
| Albert Houghton | 1907 |
| Pat Page | 1908, 1909, & 1910 |
| Nelson Norgren | 1914 |
| Tony Hinkle | 1919 & 1920 |
| R. D. Birkhoff | 1921 |

=== Rhodes Scholars ===
| Player | Year(s) |
|---|---|
| Edwin Hubble | 1910 |
| John McDonough | 1928 |
| Sean Mahoney | 1984 |
| Bradley Henderson | 2001 |

== Coaching history ==
| Coach | Years | Record | Conference; Record | Conference; Titles | National; Championships |
| Horace Butterworth | 1895–1897 | 10–4 | 0-0 | 0 | 0 |
| Wilfred Childs | 1903–1906 | 21-8 | 3-5 | 0 | 0 |
| Joseph Raycroft | 1906–1910 | 66-7 | 34-5 | 4 | 3 |
| John Schommer | 1910–1911 | 13-5 | 7-5 | 0 | 0 |
| Harlan "Pat" Page | 1911–1920 | 161–76 | 66-42 | 1 | 0 |
| Amos Alonzo Stagg | 1920–1921 | 14-6 | 6-6 | 0 | 0 |
| Nelson Norgren | 1921–1942; 1944-1957 | 120-272; 65-147 | 52-203; 0-12 | 0 | 0 |
| J. Kyle Anderson | 1942–1944 | 1-40 | 0-17 | 0 | 0 |
| Joseph Stampf | 1957–1975 | 208–118 | * | * | 0 |
| John Angelus | 1975–1991 | 146–177 | 65-117 | 0 | 0 |
| Pat Cunningham | 1991–1999 | 115–91 | 62-50 | 2 | 0 |
| Mike McGrath | 1999– | 237–170 | 142–84 | 4 | 0 |
| Totals | | 1,166-1,128 | 437-546 | 11 | 3 |

== Maroons home courts ==
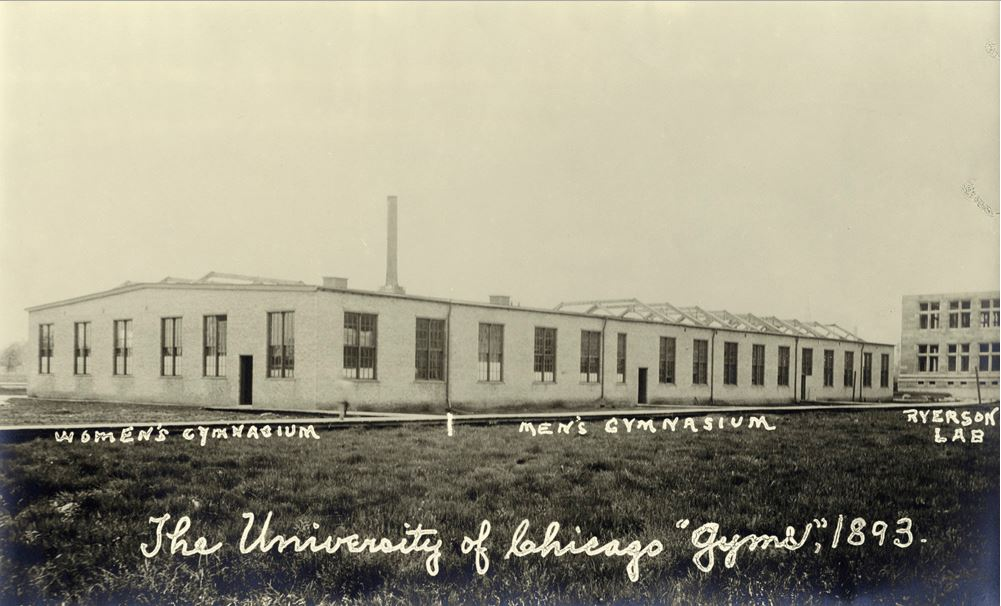
University of Chicago Gymnasium]

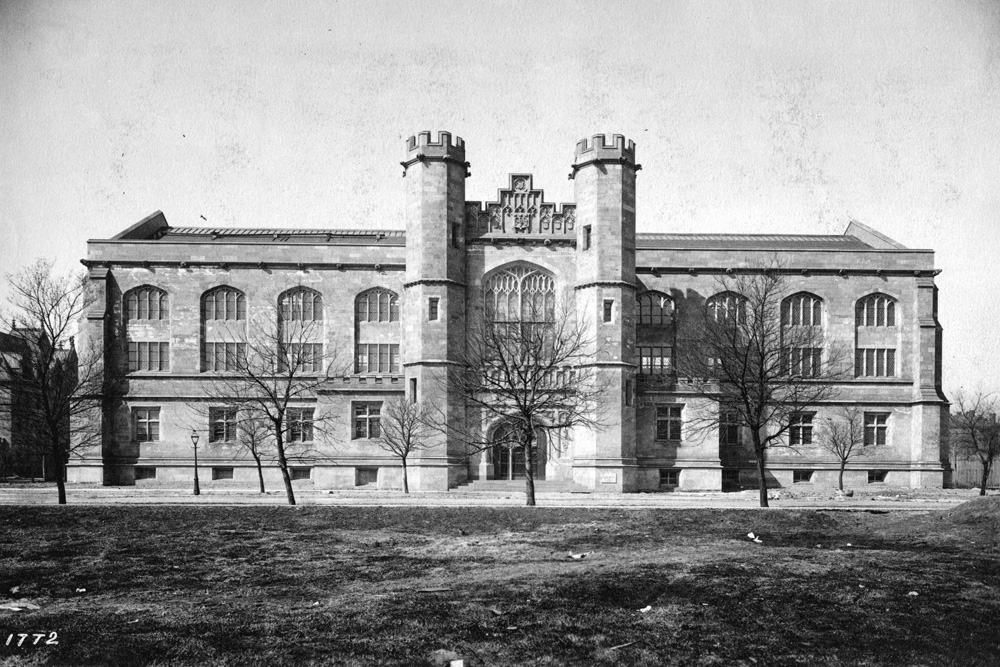
Bartlett Gymnasium

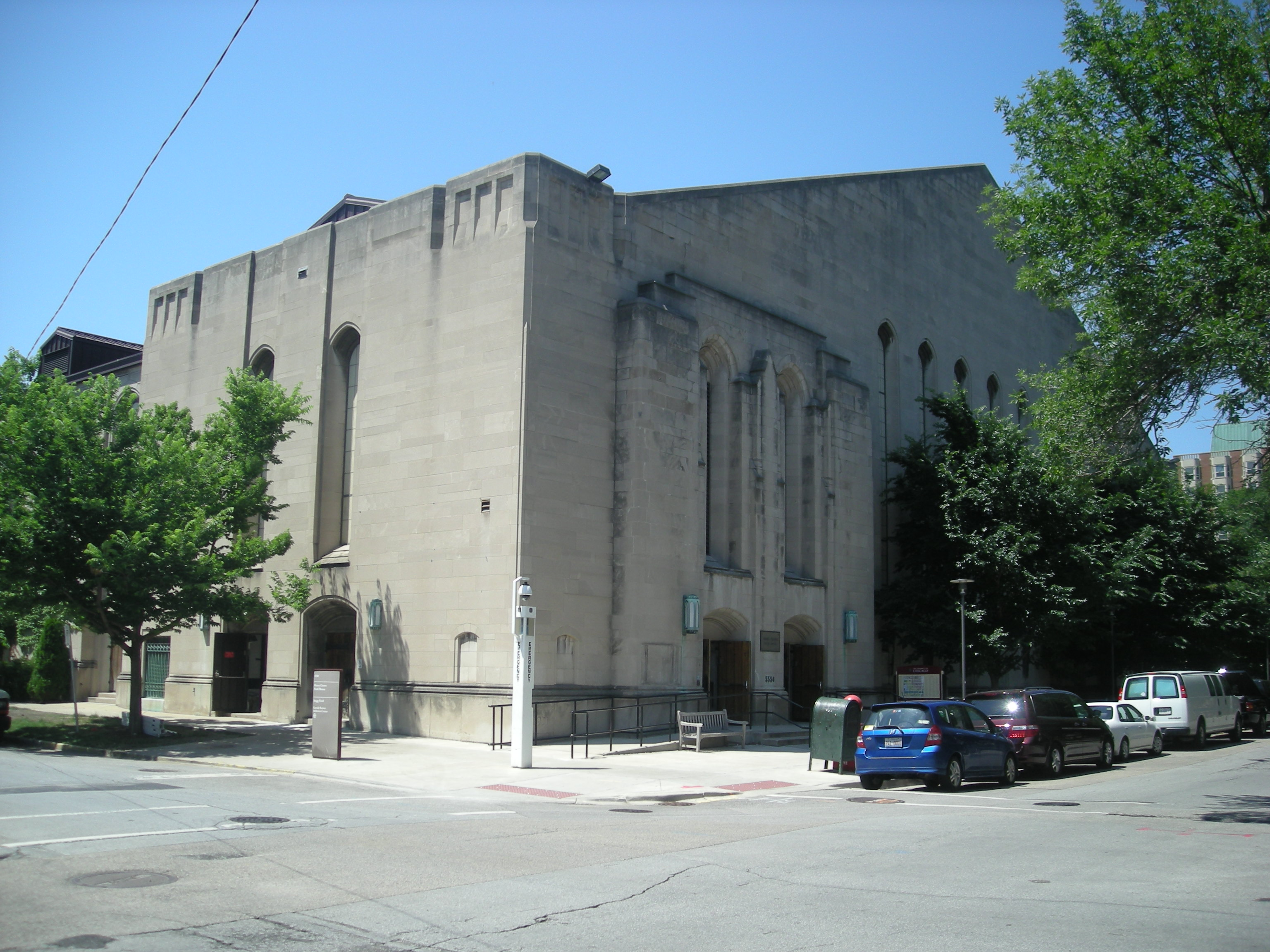
Henry Crown Field House

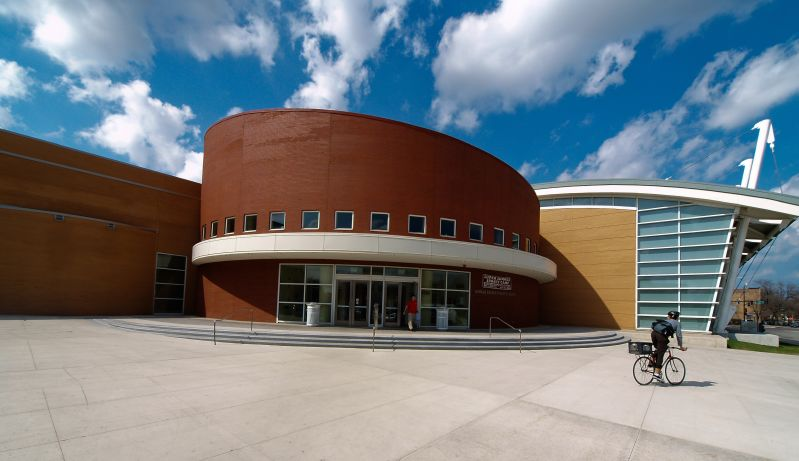
Ratner Athletic Center

- Men's Gymnasium was located on the campus of the University of Chicago, a temporary structure built in 1891 and demolished in 1904.
- Bartlett Gymnasium (1903–1932) is located on the campus of the University of Chicago, the building is named after Frank Dickinson Bartlett. Bartlett's father, Adolphus Clay Bartlett, erected the gym as a memorial to his son who died of appendicitis in Munich, Bavaria, July 15, 1900, at the age of 20.
- Henry Crown Field House (1933–2003) erected in 1932 as a single-story building. It originally served as an indoor practice facility with a dirt infield that was utilized for football and baseball practices. A track encircled the infield and a raised wood floor was used for basketball. It is named after Chicago philanthropist Henry Crown.
- Gerald Ratner Athletics Center (2003–present) opened on September 29, 2003, and continues to attract attention for its design and construction. The building was named after University of Chicago alumnus, Gerald Ratner. It has earned numerous awards for its engineering and material usage. The architect of this suspension structure that is supported by masts, cables and counterweights was César Pelli, who is best known as the architect of the Petronas Towers.
