= 1908–09 Kansas Jayhawks men's basketball team =

American college basketball season

1908–09 Kansas Jayhawks men's basketball

MVIAA Champions
- Conference: MVIAA
- Record: 25–3 (6–2 MVIAA)
- Head coach: Phog Allen (2nd season)
- Captain: Earl Woodward
- Home arena: Robinson Gymnasium

1908–09 Missouri Valley Intercollegiate Athletic Association men's basketball standings
	Conf.				Overall
Team	W		L	PCT	W		L	PCT
North Division
Nebraska	5	–	5	.500	8	–	15	.348
Iowa State	4	–	4	.500	4	–	10	.286
Drake	3	–	5	.375	3	–	7	.300
South Division
Kansas†	8	–	2	.800	25	–	3	.893
Missouri	3	–	5	.375	11	–	5	.688
Washington University	3	–	5	.375	3	–	5	.375
† Conference championship winner

The 1908–09 Kansas Jayhawks men's basketball team represented the University of Kansas in its eleventh season of collegiate basketball, and its second in the Missouri Valley Intercollegiate Athletic Association, or MVIAA. The team would go on to win its second MVIAA Conference Championship. They finished the season 25–3. The head coach was Phog Allen, serving in his second and final year of his first tenure. Thomas Johnson was retroactively named an All-American by the Helms Foundation, making him the first Jayhawk to earn the honor.

== Roster ==
- Ralph Bergen
- Robert Heizer
- Tommy Johnson
- Verne Long
- Donald Martindell
- George McCune
- Carl Rouse
- Earl Woodward

== Schedule ==
Date time, TV	Opponent	Result	Record	Site city, state
Dec. 10, 1908*	at Baker	W 21–17	1–0	Baldwin City, Kansas
Dec. 12, 1908*	Baker	W 44–16	2–0	Robinson Gymnasium; Lawrence, Kansas
Dec. 14, 1908*	at Emporia State	W 36–24	3–0	Emporia, Kansas
Dec. 15, 1908*	at Kansas State; Sunflower Showdown	W 42–27	4–0	Nichols Hall; Manhattan, Kansas
Dec. 16, 1908*	at Kansas Wesleyan	W 35–18	5–0	Salina, Kansas
Dec. 17, 1908*	at Bethany	W 36–24	6–0	Lindsborg, Kansas
Dec. 18, 1908*	at Fairmont	W 65–15	7–0	Wichita, Kansas
Dec. 19, 1908*	at Winfield YMCA	W 47–34	8–0	Winfield, Kansas
Dec. 21, 1908*	at Chilocco	W 39-9	9–0	Chilocco, Oklahoma
Jan. 8, 1909*	Nebraska	W 48-13	10–0	Robinson Gymnasium; Lawrence, Kansas
Jan. 9, 1909*	Nebraska	W 36-17	11–0	Robinson Gymnasium; Lawrence, Kansas
Jan. 11, 1909	Iowa State	W 65–22	12–0	Robinson Gymnasium; Lawrence, Kansas
Jan. 16, 1909*	William Jewell	W 63–12	13–0	Robinson Gymnasium; Lawrence, Kansas
Jan. 22, 1909*	Ottawa	W 61–22	14–0	Robinson Gymnasium; Lawrence, Kansas
Jan. 23, 1909*	Washburn	W 36–10	15–0	Robinson Gymnasium; Lawrence, Kansas
Jan. 30, 1909*	at Nebraska	W 18–13	16–0	Grant Memorial Hall; Lincoln, Nebraska
Feb. 3, 1909	Missouri; Border War	W 24–14	17–0	Robinson Gymnasium; Lawrence, Kansas
Feb. 4, 1909	Missouri; Border War	W 31–23	18–0	Robinson Gymnasium; Lawrence, Kansas
Feb. 9, 1909*	Warrensburg	W 37–14	19–0	Warrensburg, Missouri
Feb. 10, 1909	at Washington (Mo.)	L 26–28	19–1	Francis Gymnasium; St. Louis, Missouri
Feb. 11, 1909	at Washington (Mo.)	W 23–18	20–1	Francis Gymnasium; St. Louis, Missouri
Feb. 12, 1909	at Missouri; Border War	W 25–19	21–1	Rothwell Gymnasium; Columbia, Missouri
Feb. 13, 1909	at Missouri; Border War	L 21–38	21–2	Rothwell Gymnasium; Columbia, Missouri
Feb. 20, 1909	Washington (Mo.)	W 33–28	22–2	Robinson Gymnasium; Lawrence, Kansas
Feb. 22, 1909	Washington (Mo.)	W 27–25	23–2	Robinson Gymnasium; Lawrence, Kansas
Mar. 4, 1909*	vs. Nebraska	W 28–22	24–2	Convention Hall; Kansas City, Missouri
Mar. 5, 1909*	vs. Nebraska	W 24–15	25–2	Convention Hall; Kansas City, Missouri
Mar. 6, 1909*	vs. Nebraska	L 29–32	25–3	Convention Hall; Kansas City, Missouri
*Non-conference game. ^{#}Rankings from AP Poll. (#) Tournament seedings in parentheses. All times are in Central Standard Time.
