= Joseph Raycroft =

American basketball and football coach; doctor (1867–1955)

Biographical details
- Born: November 15, 1867; Williamstown, Vermont, U.S.
- Died: September 30, 1955 (aged 87); Trenton, New Jersey, U.S.
- Education: University of Chicago (1896); Rush Medical College (1899)

Playing career

Football
- 1892–1893: Chicago
- Position: Quarterback

Coaching career (HC unless noted)

Football
- 1894: Lawrence
- 1895–1896: Stevens Point Normal

Basketball
- 1906–1910: Chicago

Head coaching record
- Overall: 9–4 (football); 66–7 (basketball)

Accomplishments and honors

Championships
- Basketball; 3 Helms national (1907–1909); 4 Western Conference (1907–1910)

Joseph Edward Raycroft (November 15, 1867 – September 30, 1955) was an American college football and college basketball coach and university professor. He was the head men's basketball coach for the University of Chicago between 1906–07 and 1909–10. In his four seasons as coach, the Chicago Maroons compiled an overall record of 66 wins and 7 losses. His teams won four Big Ten Conference championships (then known as the Western Conference), and the 1907, 1908, and 1909 teams were all retroactively named national champions by the Helms Athletic Foundation; his 1909 team was also retroactively ranked as the season's top team by the Premo-Porretta Power Poll. His 90.4% career winning percentage is the highest all-time at Chicago. Prior to his time at Chicago, Raycroft also served as Lawrence University's head football coach for the 1894 season and compiled a 3–2 record. Raycroft also served as head football coach at Stevens Point Normal School—now known as the University of Wisconsin–Stevens Point—for two seasons, from 1895 to 1896.

Raycroft later served as Princeton University's Chairman of the Department of Health and Physical Education from 1911 until his retirement in 1936. Raycroft developed a comprehensive student health program based in large measure upon intramural athletics, with participation rates approaching 90 percent of Princeton's undergraduate class.

== Head coaching record ==
=== Football ===
Year	Team	Overall	Conference	Standing	Bowl/playoffs
Lawrence Vikings (Independent) (1894)
1894	Lawrence	3–2			
Lawrence:		3–2			
Stevens Point Normal (Independent) (1895–1896)
1895	Stevens Point Normal	3–1			
1896	Stevens Point Normal	3–1			
Stevens Point Normal:		6–2			
Total:		9–4			

=== Basketball ===
Record table
Season	Team	Overall	Conference	Standing	Postseason
Chicago Maroons (Western Conference) (1906–1910)
1906–07	Chicago	21–2	6–2	T–1st	Helms National Champions
1907–08	Chicago	23–2	7–1	T–1st	Helms National Champions
1908–09	Chicago	12–0	12–0	1st	Helms National Champions
1909–10	Chicago	10–3	9–3	1st	
Total:		66–7 (.904)			
National champion Postseason invitational champion Conference regular season champion Conference regular season and conference tournament champion Division regular season champion Division regular season and conference tournament champion Conference tournament champion
