= 1908–09 Iowa State Cyclones men's basketball team =

American college basketball season

1908–09 Iowa State Cyclones men's basketball
- Conference: Missouri Valley Intercollegiate Athletic Association
- Record: 4–10 (4–4 MVIAA)
- Head coach: Clyde Williams (2nd season)
- Home arena: Margaret Hall Gymnasium

1908–09 Missouri Valley Intercollegiate Athletic Association men's basketball standings
| | Conf. | | | | Overall |
| Team | W | | L | PCT | W | | L | PCT |
|---|---|---|---|---|---|---|---|---|
North Division
| Nebraska | 5 | – | 5 | .500 | 8 | – | 15 | .348 |
| Iowa State | 4 | – | 4 | .500 | 4 | – | 10 | .286 |
| Drake | 3 | – | 5 | .375 | 3 | – | 7 | .300 |
South Division
| Kansas† | 8 | – | 2 | .800 | 25 | – | 3 | .893 |
| Missouri | 3 | – | 5 | .375 | 11 | – | 5 | .688 |
| Washington University | 3 | – | 5 | .375 | 3 | – | 5 | .375 |
† Conference championship winner

The 1908–09 Iowa State Cyclones men's basketball team (also known informally as Ames) represented Iowa State University during the 1908–09 IAAUS men's basketball season. The Cyclones were coached by Clyde Williams, in his second season with the Cyclones. The Cyclones played their home games at the Margaret Hall Gymnasium in Ames, Iowa.

They finished the season 4–10, 4–4 in Missouri Valley play to finish in second place in the North division.

== Roster ==
1908–09 Iowa State Cyclones men's basketball team
Players
Coaches

| Pos. | # | Name | Height | Weight | Year | Hometown |
|---|---|---|---|---|---|---|
| F | | Joe Brown (C) | — | — | So | Sioux City, Iowa |
| | | DeVault | — | — |
| F | | Howard Herbert | — | — | | Atlantic, Iowa |
| | | Johnson | — | — |
| | | Frederick Law | — | — |
| | | Clark Mosher | — | — | So |
| | | Edward Schroeder | — | — | | Davenport, Iowa |
| | | Wakeman | — | — |
| F | | Albert Weiss | — | — | So | Denison, Iowa |

Head coach

- Clyde Williams

Assistant coach(es)

Legend

- (C) Team captain
- (S) Suspended
- (I) Ineligible
- (W) Walk-on
- Injured
- Current redshirt

== Schedule and results ==
| Date time, TV | Rank^{#} | Opponent^{#} | Result | Record | Site city, state |
Regular season
| January 9, 1909* | | at Missouri | L 14–53 | 0–1 | Rothwell Gymnasium; Columbia, Missouri |
| January 11, 1909* | | at Kansas | L 22–65 | 0–2 | Robinson Gymnasium; Lawrence, Kansas |
| January 12, 1909* | | at Kansas State | L 32–42 | 0–3 | Nichols Hall; Manhattan, Kansas |
| January 13, 1909* | | at Nebraska Wesleyan | L 21–31 | 0–4 | Lincoln, Nebraska |
| January 15, 1909 | | at Nebraska | L 20–42 | 0–5 (0–1) | Grant Memorial Hall; Lincoln, Nebraska |
| January 16, 1909 | | at Nebraska | L 21–40 | 0–6 (0–2) | Grant Memorial Hall; Lincoln, Nebraska |
| January 26, 1909 | | Drake; Iowa Big Four | L 24–31 | 0–7 (0–3) | Margaret Hall Gymnasium; Ames, Iowa |
| February 2, 1909 | | at Drake; Iowa Big Four | W 30–22 | 1–7 (1–3) | "The Shed"; Des Moines, Iowa |
| February 3, 1909 | | at Grinnell | L 11–53 | 1–8 | Grinnell, Iowa |
| February 8, 1909 | | Nebraska | W 22–16 | 2–8 (2–3) | Margaret Hall Gymnasium; Ames, Iowa |
| February 9, 1909 | | Nebraska | L 17–31 | 2–9 (2–4) | Margaret Hall Gymnasium; Ames, Iowa |
| February 13, 1909 | | Drake; Iowa Big Four | W 38–31 | 3–9 (3–4) | Margaret Hall Gymnasium; Ames, Iowa |
| February 20, 1909* | | Grinnell | L 13–27 | 3–10 | Margaret Hall Gymnasium; Ames, Iowa |
| February 26, 1909* | | at Drake; Iowa Big Four | W 32–30 | 4–10 (4–4) | "The Shed"; Des Moines, Iowa |
*Non-conference game. ^{#}Rankings from AP poll. (#) Tournament seedings in parentheses. All times are in Central Time.
