= 1921–22 Michigan State Normal Normalites men's basketball team =

American college basketball season

1921–22 Michigan State Normal Normalites men's basketball

MIAA Runner-Up
- Conference: Michigan Intercollegiate Athletic Association
- Record: 11–6 (6–1 MIAA)
- Head coach: Joseph H. McCulloch (1st season)
- Assistant coach: Rowland Winston
- Home arena: Gymnasium

The 1921–22 Michigan State Normal Normalites men's basketball team represented the Michigan State Normal School, now Eastern Michigan University, in the 1921–22 NCAA men's basketball season. The team finished with a record of 11–6 and were the runner-up for the Michigan Intercollegiate Athletic Association Championship. The team was led by first year head coach Joseph H. McCulloch. Williams was the team captain and Rowland Winston was the team manager.

== Roster ==
Number	Name	Position	Class	Hometown
	Harold Osborne	Center	Junior	Whittaker, MI
	Paul Burrell	Center		Ypsilanti, MI
	Boyd "Bill" Williams			
	Ted Williamson	Center	Freshman	Ypsilanti, MI
	Harold C. Dillon	Forward	Freshman	Grand Rapids, MI
	Harry W. Clark			
	Malcolm Dickie			
	Perry Deakin	Guard	Sophomore	Detroit, MI
	Orel C. Champney	Sophomore	Guard	Alden, MI
	Francis Davidson	Forward	Freshman	Pontiac, MI

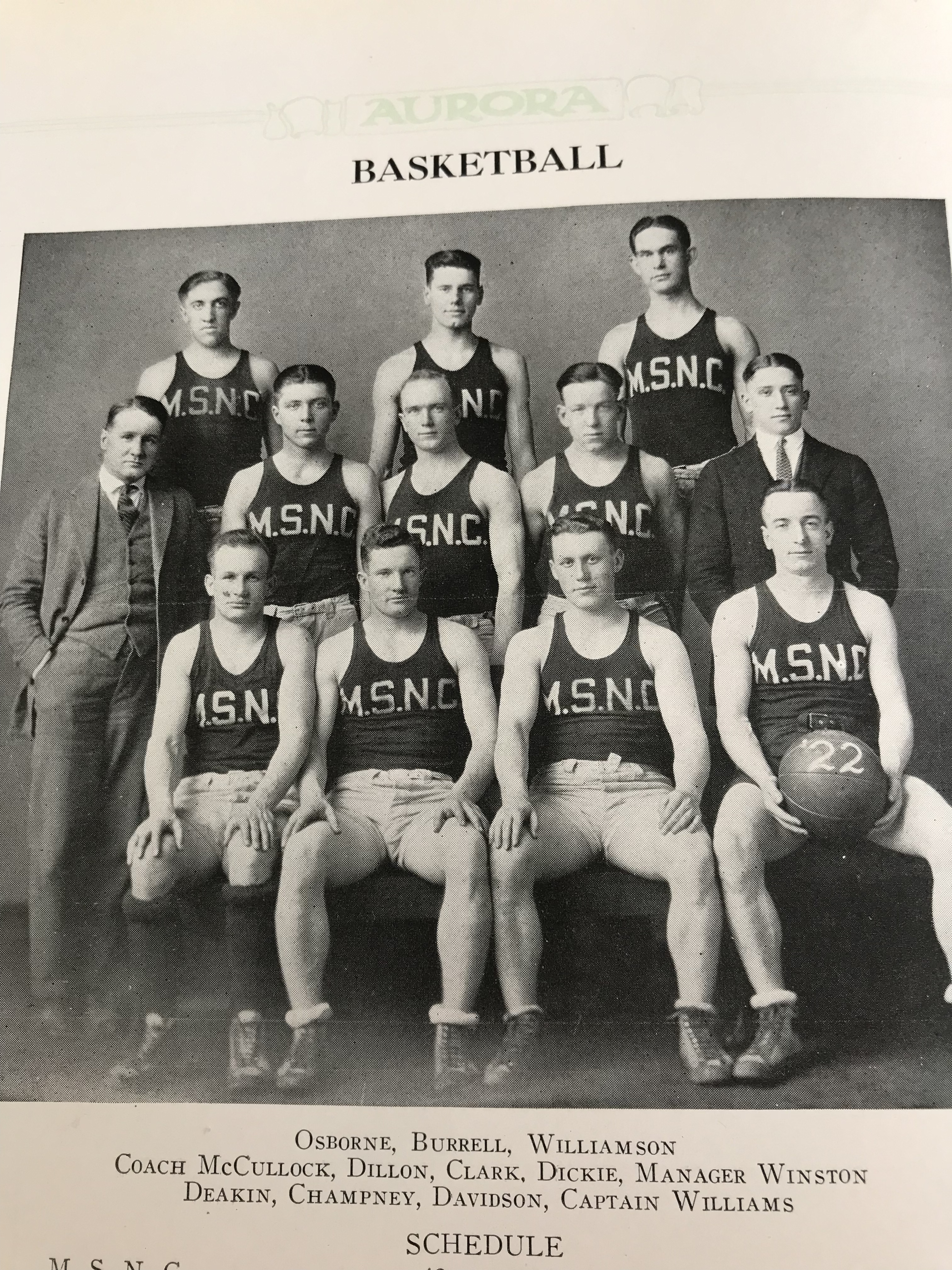
1921-22 Michigan State Normal College Men's Basketball Team

== Awards ==
Osborne was named All MIAA center.

== Schedule ==
Date time, TV	Opponent	Result	Record	Site (attendance) city, state
regular season
January 6, 1922	at Adrian College	W 42–24	1–0	Adrian, MI
January 11, 1922*	Highland Park Junior College	W 32–22	2–0	Gymnasium; Ypsilanti, MI
January 13, 1922	at Olivet College	W 14–10	3–0	Olivet, MI
January 14, 1922*	at Michigan State	L 22–28 ^{OT}	3–1	IM Circle; East Lansing, MI
January 21, 1922*	Central Michigan	L 37–45	3–2	Gymnasium; Ypsilanti, MI
January 27, 1922	Alma College	W 29–18	4–2	Gymnasium; Ypsilanti, MI
January 31, 1922*	at Detroit Mercy	W 29–27	5–2	Detroit, MI
February 3, 1922	Olivet College	W 57–9	6–2	Gymnasium; Ypsilanti, MI
February 4, 1922*	at Highland Park Junior College	W 34–18	7–2	Highland Park, MI
February 8, 1922*	at Wayne State	W 23–15	8–2	Detroit, MI
February 10, 1922	Adrian College	W 51–11	9–2	Gymnasium; Ypsilanti, MI
February 11, 1922*	at Western Michigan	W 23–16	10–2	East Hall Gymnasium; Kalamazoo, MI
February 17, 1922*	at Central Michigan	L 25–40	10–3	Central Hall; Mount Pleasant, MI
February 18, 1922	at Alma College	W 13–11	11–3	Alma, MI
February 22, 1922*	Wayne State	L 19–23	11–4	Gymnasium; Ypsilanti, MI
February 25, 1922*	Western Michigan	L 16–34	11–5	Gymnasium; Ypsilanti, MI
March 7, 1922	Kalamazoo College; MIAA Championship	L 15–25	11–6	State Armory; Kalamazoo, MI
March 11, 1922	Albion College			Gymnasium; Ypsilanti, MI
*Non-conference game. (#) Tournament seedings in parentheses. All times are in Eastern Time.

== Game Notes ==
=== January 13, 1922 ===
EMU Media Guide has 14-1. Olivet and the Aurora both have the score 14-10.

=== January 31, 1922 ===
Aurora list score as 28-23. Detroit Mercy has this game vs EMU in their Media Guide, while EMU has this vs Detroit YMCA.

=== February 3, 1922 ===
Olivet has score 58-12.

=== February 8, 1922 ===
Wayne State has a score of 15-24 with a Wayne State victory.
