= Herb Juul =

American baseball player (1886–1928)

- Pitcher
- Born: February 2, 1886; Chicago, Illinois, U.S.
- Died: November 14, 1928 (aged 42); Chicago, Illinois, U.S.
- Batted: Left Threw: Left

MLB debut
- July 11, 1911, for the Cincinnati Reds

Last MLB appearance
- July 15, 1911, for the Cincinnati Reds

MLB statistics
- Win–loss record: 0–0
- Strikeouts: 2
- Earned run average: 4.50
- Stats at Baseball Reference

Teams
- Cincinnati Reds (1911)
Coaching career
Current position
Conference	Big Ten
Coaching career (HC unless noted)
1908-1910	Illinois
Head coaching record
Overall	12–10

Herbert Victor Juul (February 2, 1886 – November 14, 1928) was an American Major League Baseball pitcher and college basketball player and coach. He played for the Cincinnati Reds in 1911. He appeared in two games for the Reds, on July 11 and July 15 of that season. In one of the games, he pitched four innings, allowing two runs on three hits. He pinch hit in the other game. Prior to his brief appearance in the majors, he attended the University of Illinois starting at guard on the 1905–06 Illinois Fighting Illini men's basketball team, captaining the 1906 team followed by coaching the 1908-09 and 1909-10 teams. He followed his coaching stint by playing three years with the Montgomery, Alabama minor league baseball team in the Southern Association.

Juul became the first Illinois basketball coach to stay for more than one year. He also became the first former Fighting Illini player to head the Illinois basketball program. After leading Illinois to a 12-10 record over two years, he departed and played small amounts with the Cincinnati Reds. Juul was the son of former Illinois Congressman, Niels Juul and, prior to his death in 1928, was a committeeman in the 35th Ward in Chicago as well as campaign director for the Republican Party headquarters at the Morrisson Hotel in Chicago.
