= Wilfred Childs =

American basketball coach

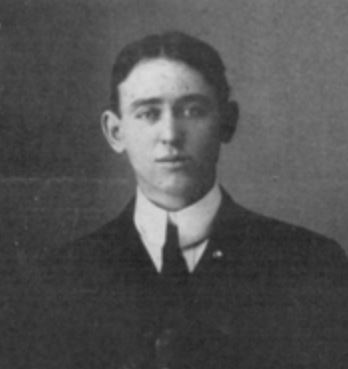

Biographical details
- Born: April 11, 1881; Harper, Kansas, U.S.
- Died: December 20, 1964 (aged 83); Glenview, Illinois, U.S.
- Education: Y.M.C.A. Training School (1903)

Coaching career (HC unless noted)
- 1903–1906: Chicago

Head coaching record
- Overall: 21–8

Wilfred Leonard "Duke" Childs (April 11, 1881 – December 20, 1964) was an American basketball coach in the early 1900s. He led the University of Chicago to an undefeated season in 1903–04 and coached two seasons for the Maroons men's basketball team. He left Chicago and take on the position of physical director of the Y.M.C.A. in Fort Worth, Texas in 1906.

Childs later was employed at New Trier High School in Winnetka, Illinois, from 1909 to 1956. He coached all sports at various times and also served as the school's athletic director for many years. He died in Glenview, Illinois, in 1964.

== Early life ==
Childs was a native of Harper, Kansas and graduated from Central High School in Springfield, Missouri in 1899. He attended the Y.M.C.A. training school of Chicago, graduating in 1903. He married Luise Wilhelmina Raeder in 1912.

== Coaching career ==
In 1903, Childs was hired by Chicago's athletic director, Amos Alonzo Stagg, as the head coach for the men's basketball team as well as an athletic instructor and assistant in physical culture for the university. During his three years as the head basketball coach, the Western Conference did not recognize a league champion. However, Childs' teams finished atop of the conference standings two out of his three years, making them unofficial conference champions in 1904 and 1905. His teams finish with an overall record of 21 wins and 8 losses. During his three years as head coach, Childs coach four-time All-American and one-time national player of the year John Schommer.

Childs also served as an assistant football coach under Stagg.

== Head coaching record ==
Record table
Season	Team	Overall	Conference	Standing	Postseason
Chicago Maroons (Independent) (1903–1905)
1903–04	Chicago	7–0			
1904–05	Chicago	9–3			
Chicago Maroons (Western Conference) (1905–1906)
1905–06	Chicago	5–5	3–5	4th	
Chicago:		21–8 (.724)	3–5 (.375)		
Total:		21–8 (.724)			
National champion Postseason invitational champion Conference regular season champion Conference regular season and conference tournament champion Division regular season champion Division regular season and conference tournament champion Conference tournament champion
