= 1908–09 Illinois Fighting Illini men's basketball team =

American college basketball season

1908–09 Illinois Fighting Illini men's basketball
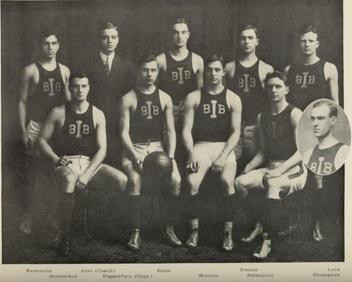
- Conference: Big Ten Conference
- Record: 7–6 (5–6 Big Ten)
- Head coach: Herb V. Juul (1st season)
- Captain: Henry Popperfuss
- Home arena: Kenney Gym

1908–09 Western Conference men's basketball standings
| | Conf. | | | | Overall |
| Team | W | | L | PCT | W | | L | PCT |
|---|---|---|---|---|---|---|---|---|
| Chicago | 12 | – | 0 | 1.000 | 12 | – | 0 | 1.000 |
| Purdue | 6 | – | 4 | .600 | 8 | – | 4 | .667 |
| Wisconsin | 5 | – | 4 | .556 | 8 | – | 4 | .667 |
| Illinois | 5 | – | 6 | .455 | 7 | – | 6 | .538 |
| Minnesota | 3 | – | 6 | .333 | 8 | – | 6 | .571 |
| Indiana | 2 | – | 6 | .250 | 5 | – | 9 | .357 |
| Northwestern | 1 | – | 4 | .200 | 1 | – | 7 | .125 |
| Iowa | 1 | – | 5 | .167 | 8 | – | 7 | .533 |

The 1908–09 Illinois Fighting Illini men's basketball team represented the University of Illinois.

== Regular season ==
The 1908–09 season witnessed the fourth coach in just four years to head up the university of Illinois Fighting Illini men's basketball team. The only difference for this season, however; was that Herb V. Juul became the first coach to stay for more than one year. He also became the first former Fighting Illini player to head the Illinois basketball program, serving as captain of the 1906–07 team. The starting lineup for the team included captain H. J. Popperfuss and Carl P. Watson at the forward positions, Emmett V. Poston as the center, and a combination of Roy G. Rennacker, Louis S. Bernstein and Thomas E. Thompson at guard. The Illini finished their season with an overall record of seven wins and six losses with a conference record of five wins, six losses and a fourth-place finish in the Western Conference.

=== Roster ===
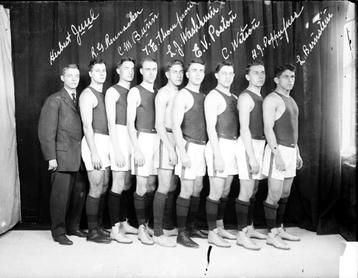
"1908-09 Fighting Illini team"

1908–09 Illinois Fighting Illini men's basketball team
Players
Coaches

| Pos. | # | Name | Height | Weight | Year | Hometown |
|---|---|---|---|---|---|---|
| F | | Carl Watson | — | — | So | DeKalb, Illinois |
| C | | Emmett V. Poston | — | — | So | Springfield, Illinois |
| F | | Henry Popperfuss (C) | — | — | Jr | Tomah, Wisconsin |
| G | | Roy Rennacker | — | — | Jr | Winnetka, Illinois |
| G | | Thomas E. Thompson | — | — | Jr | Williams Bay, Wisconsin |
| F | | Avery Brundage | — | — | Sr | Chicago, Illinois |
| G | | Louis S. Bernstein | — | — | So | Niagara Falls, New York |
| F | | Charles M. Bunn | — | — | Jr | DeKalb, Illinois |
| F | | Chester Arthur Lord | — | — | Jr | Sioux Falls, South Dakota |
| G | | David Roy Palmquist | — | — | So | Moline, Illinois |

Head coach

- Herb V. Juul (University of Illinois) (1st year)

Assistant coach(es)

Legend

- (C) Team captain
- (S) Suspended
- (I) Ineligible
- (W) Walk-on
- Injured
- Current redshirt

Roster

== Schedule ==
| Date time, TV | Rank^{#} | Opponent^{#} | Result | Record | Site city, state |
Non-Conference regular season
| 12/22/1908* | | Shelbyville Business College | W 93–19 | 1-0 | Kenney Gym; Urbana, IL |
| 12/23/1908* | | at Mt. Vernon | W 47–25 | 2-0 | Mt. Vernon High School; Mt. Vernon, IL |
Big Ten regular season
| 1/9/1909 | | Indiana; Rivalry | W 30–2 | 3-0 (1-0) | Kenney Gym; Urbana, IL |
| 1/16/1909 | | Wisconsin | W 28–19 | 4-0 (2-0) | Kenney Gym; Urbana, IL |
| 1/22/1909 | | at Minnesota | L 17–18 | 4-1 (2-1) | University of Minnesota Armory; Minneapolis, MN |
| 1/23/1909 | | at Wisconsin | L 10–20 | 4-2 (2-2) | University of Wisconsin Armory and Gymnasium; Madison, WI |
| 2/10/1909 | | Minnesota | W 21–20 | 5-2 (3-2) | Kenney Gym; Urbana, IL |
| 2/13/1909 | | Chicago | L 15–17 | 5-3 (3-3) | Kenney Gym; Urbana, IL |
| 2/17/1909 | | Purdue | W 24–18 | 6-3 (4-3) | Kenney Gym; Urbana, IL |
| 2/26/1909 | | at Chicago | L 10–23 | 6-4 (4-4) | Bartlett Gymnasium; Chicago, IL |
| 2/27/1909 | | at Northwestern; Rivalry | W 35–4 | 7-4 (5-4) | Patten Gymnasium; Evanston, IL |
| 3/5/1909 | | at Purdue | L 20–30 | 7-5 (5-5) | Lafayette Coliseum; West Lafayette, IN |
| 3/6/1909 | | at Indiana; Rivalry | L 12–20 | 7-6 (5-6) | Old Assembly Hall; Bloomington, IN |
*Non-conference game. ^{#}Rankings from AP Poll. (#) Tournament seedings in parentheses. All times are in Central Time.
