= Robert Harris (basketball) =

American football and basketball player and basketball coach (1886–1964)

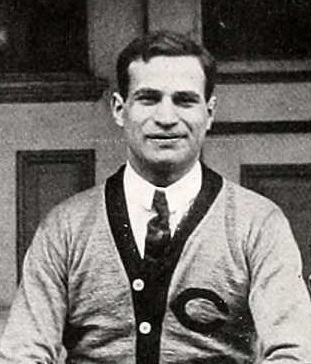
- Harris from The Arbutus, 1909

Biographical details
- Born: December 6, 1886; Chicago, Illinois, U.S.
- Died: July 1964 (aged 77)

Playing career
- 1907–1908: Chicago

Coaching career (HC unless noted)
- 1909: Indiana

Head coaching record
- Overall: 5–9

Robert S. Harris (December 6, 1886 – July 11, 1964) was an American football and basketball player and basketball coach. He played college football and basketball at the University of Chicago. He was the head coach of the 1908–09 Indiana Hoosiers men's basketball team.

== Early years ==
Harris was born in 1886. He attended Hyde Park High School in Chicago where he played football as a center.

He attended the University of Chicago, where he was a member of Amos Alonzo Stagg's football teams that won consecutive Western Conference championships in 1907 and 1908. He also played basketball at Chicago and was a member of the 1906–07 and 1907–08 Chicago Maroons men's basketball teams that compiled a combined 44–4 record and were recognized by the Helms Athletic Foundation as national champion for both years.

== Indiana University ==
Harris was the head coach of the 1908–09 Indiana Hoosiers men's basketball team. The team compiled a 5–9 record.

== Military service and later years ==
During World War I, Harris served overseas in the U.S. Army's Rainbow Division under the command of Douglas MacArthur. He later served during World War II as commander of military training schools at Princeton University, Western Reserve University, University of Virginia, and University of Chicago. He reached the rank of colonel in the Army.

For 50 years, Harris worked as a certified life insurance underwriter for Northwestern Mutual Life Insurance Company in Chicago. He married Sylvia Morrison; they had two daughters, Ruth M. Harris and Roberta Tugenberg. In 1964, Harris died in Chicago at the Veterans Administration Research Hospital at age 77.
