= 1908–09 Drake Bulldogs men's basketball team =

American college basketball season

1908–09 Drake Bulldogs men's basketball
- Conference: Big Eight Conference|Missouri Valley Intercollegiate Athletic Association
- North
- Record: 3–8 (3–5 MVIAA)
- Head coach: C.A. Pell
- Home arena: None

1908–09 Missouri Valley Intercollegiate Athletic Association men's basketball standings
	Conf.				Overall
Team	W		L	PCT	W		L	PCT
North Division
Nebraska	5	–	5	.500	8	–	15	.348
Iowa State	4	–	4	.500	4	–	10	.286
Drake	3	–	5	.375	3	–	7	.300
South Division
Kansas†	8	–	2	.800	25	–	3	.893
Missouri	3	–	5	.375	11	–	5	.688
Washington University	3	–	5	.375	3	–	5	.375
† Conference championship winner

The 1908–09 Drake Bulldogs men's basketball team represented Drake University in the 1908–09 college basketball season. The team was led by third year head coach C.A. Pell. This was also Drake's second season as a member of the Missouri Valley Intercollegiate Athletic Association. They finished with a 1–4 record the previous season. Drake played its first ever home game, a 19–15 win on February 10, 1909, against Nebraska.

== Schedule ==
Missouri Valley Intercollegiate Athletic Association Standing: 3rd North Division
Date	Opponent*	Location	Time^{#}	Result	Overall	Conference
**Regular Season Games**
January 22, 1909	**Nebraska**	Lincoln, NE		L 30–39	0–1	0–1
January 23, 1909	**Nebraska**	Lincoln, NE		L 12–34	0–2	0–2
January 26, 1909	**Iowa State College**	Ames, IA		W 31–24	1–2	1–2
January 30, 1909	Grinnell	Grinnell, IA		L 8–42	1–3	1–2
February 10, 1909	**Nebraska**	Des Moines, IA		W 19–15	2–3	2–2
February 11, 1909	**Nebraska**	Des Moines, IA		W 25–15	3–3	3–2
February 13, 1909	**Iowa State College**	Ames, IA		L 31–39	3–4	3–3
February 22, 1909	Iowa	Des Moines, IA		L 13–36	3–5	3–3
February 24, 1909	**Iowa State College**	Des Moines, IA		L 22–30	3–6	3–4
February 26, 1909	**Iowa State College**	Des Moines, IA		L 30–32	3–7	3–5
March 2, 1909	Grinnell	Des Moines, IA		L 13–39	3–8	3–6
All times are in EST. Conference games in **BOLD**.
