= 1908–09 Indiana Hoosiers men's basketball team =

American college basketball season

1908–09 Indiana Hoosiers men's basketball
- Conference: Big Ten Conference
- Record: 5–9 (2–6 Western)
- Head coach: Robert Harris (1st season)
- Captain: Arthur Berndt
- Home arena: Old Assembly Hall

1908–09 Western Conference men's basketball standings
| | Conf. | | | | Overall |
| Team | W | | L | PCT | W | | L | PCT |
|---|---|---|---|---|---|---|---|---|
| Chicago | 12 | – | 0 | 1.000 | 12 | – | 0 | 1.000 |
| Purdue | 6 | – | 4 | .600 | 8 | – | 4 | .667 |
| Wisconsin | 5 | – | 4 | .556 | 8 | – | 4 | .667 |
| Illinois | 5 | – | 6 | .455 | 7 | – | 6 | .538 |
| Minnesota | 3 | – | 6 | .333 | 8 | – | 6 | .571 |
| Indiana | 2 | – | 6 | .250 | 5 | – | 9 | .357 |
| Northwestern | 1 | – | 4 | .200 | 1 | – | 7 | .125 |
| Iowa | 1 | – | 5 | .167 | 8 | – | 7 | .533 |

The 1908–09 Indiana Hoosiers men's basketball team represented Indiana University. Their head coach was Robert Harris, who was in his 1st and only year. The team played its home games at the Old Assembly Hall in Bloomington, Indiana, and was a member of the Western Conference.

The Hoosiers finished the regular season with an overall record of 5–9 and a conference record of 2–6, finishing 6th in the Western Conference.

== Roster ==
| Name | Position | Year | Hometown |
|---|---|---|---|
| Dean Barnhart | F | So. | Rochester, Indiana |
| Arthur Berndt | G | So. | Indianapolis, Indiana |
| Clyde Chattin | F | Jr. | Shoals, Indiana |
| William Hipskind | F | So. | Wabash, Indiana |
| Arthur Rogers | C | Jr. | Washington, Indiana |
| Frank Thompson | G | Sr. | Winchester, Indiana |
| George Thompson | C | N/A | N/A |
| George Trimble | G | Sr. | Evansville, Indiana |
| William Wellman | G | N/A | Indianapolis, Indiana |

== Schedule/results ==
| Date time, TV | Rank^{#} | Opponent^{#} | Result | Record | Site city, state |
Regular season
| 12/12/1908* | | Marion Athletic Club | L 23–27 | 0–1 | Old Assembly Hall; Bloomington, IN |
| 1/5/1909* | | Battery A | L 21–24 | 0–2 | Old Assembly Hall; Bloomington, IN |
| 1/9/1909 | | at Illinois; Rivalry | L 2–30 | 0–3 (0–1) | Kenney Gym; Urbana, IL |
| 1/15/1909 | | at Chicago | L 12–18 | 0–4 (0–2) | Bartlett Gymnasium; Chicago, IL |
| 1/16/1909 | | at Northwestern | L 12–16 | 0–5 (0–3) | Evanston, IL |
| 1/23/1909* | | Rose Poly | W 27–12 | 1–5 (0–3) | Old Assembly Hall; Bloomington, IN |
| 1/29/1909 | | Iowa | W 18–12 | 2–5 (1–3) | Old Assembly Hall; Bloomington, IN |
| 2/6/1909 | | Purdue; Rivalry | L 14–28 | 2–6 (1–4) | Old Assembly Hall; Bloomington, IN |
| 2/9/1909* | | DePauw | W 31–20 | 3–6 (1–4) | Old Assembly Hall; Bloomington, IN |
| 2/13/1909* | | at Marion Athletic Club | L 31–34 | 3–7 (1–4) | Marion, IN |
| 2/19/1909 | | Chicago | L 10–17 | 3–8 (1–5) | Old Assembly Hall; Bloomington, IN |
| 2/26/1909* | | at DePauw | W 27–12 | 4–8 (1–5) | Greencastle, IN |
| 3/6/1909 | | Illinois; Rivalry | W 23–13 | 5–8 (2–5) | Old Assembly Hall; Bloomington, IN |
| 3/13/1909 | | at Purdue; Rivalry | L 13–30 | 5–9 (2–6) | Lafayette Coliseum; West Lafayette, IN |
*Non-conference game. ^{#}Rankings from AP Poll. (#) Tournament seedings in parentheses.
