= Ralph Morgan (basketball) =

American basketball administrator

Ralph Morgan (March 9, 1884 – January 5, 1965) was an American basketball administrator. Born in Philadelphia, Pennsylvania, he was instrumental in early 20th century development of basketball rules. He founded the College Basketball Rules Committee in 1905. In 1931, CBRC became the National Basketball Rules Committee. He contributed to the rulebook until 1958. He also founded the Eastern Intercollegiate Basketball League, which later became the Ivy League. He was enshrined in the Basketball Hall of Fame as a contributor in 1959.
