= 1921–22 Trinity Blue and White men's basketball team =

American college basketball season

1921–22 Trinity Blue and White men's basketball
- Conference: Independent
- Record: 6–12
- Head coach: James Baldwin (1st season)
- Captain: Oscar Richardson
- Home arena: The Ark

The 1921–22 Trinity Blue and White's basketball team represented Trinity College (later renamed Duke University) during the 1921–22 men's college basketball season. The head coach was James Baldwin, coaching his first season with Trinity. The team finished with an overall record of 6–12.

== Schedule ==
Date time, TV	Opponent	Result	Record	Site city, state
*	Durham YMCA	L 22–30	0–1	The Ark; Durham, NC
*	Durham YMCA	W 37–26	1–1	The Ark; Durham, NC
1/13/1922*	South Carolina	W 41–25	2–1	The Ark; Durham, NC
1/21/1922*	at N.C. State	W 23–19	3–1	
1/25/1922*	Wake Forest	W 31–10	4–1	The Ark; Durham, NC
1/31/1922*	at Wake Forest	L 22–24	4–2	The Ark; Durham, NC
2/4/1922*	at North Carolina	L 22–38	4–3	Chapel Hill, NC
2/6/1922*	at Elon	L 29–30	4–4	
2/7/1922*	Davidson	W 24–18	5–4	The Ark; Durham, NC
2/9/1922*	Guilford	W 38–24	6–4	The Ark; Durham, NC
2/13/1922*	at Davidson	L 27–32	6–5	
2/14/1922*	at Georgia	L 19–29	6–6	
2/15/1922*	at Georgia Tech	L 16–17	6–7	
2/16/1922*	at Atlanta AC	L 19–56	6–8	
2/18/1922*	at Alabama	L 16–28	6–9	
2/20/1922*	at Florida	L 26–33	6–10	
3/1/1922*	NC State	L 23–28	6–11	The Ark; Durham, NC
3/7/1922*	North Carolina	L 23–29	6–12	The Ark; Durham, NC
*Non-conference game. (#) Tournament seedings in parentheses.
