= 1908–09 Missouri Tigers men's basketball team =

American college basketball season

1908–09 Missouri Tigers men's basketball
- Conference: MVIAA
- Record: 10–5 (4–5 MVIAA)
- Head coach: Guy Lowman
- Home arena: Rothwell Gymnasium

1908–09 Missouri Valley Intercollegiate Athletic Association men's basketball standings
	Conf.				Overall
Team	W		L	PCT	W		L	PCT
North Division
Nebraska	5	–	5	.500	8	–	15	.348
Iowa State	4	–	4	.500	4	–	10	.286
Drake	3	–	5	.375	3	–	7	.300
South Division
Kansas†	8	–	2	.800	25	–	3	.893
Missouri	3	–	5	.375	11	–	5	.688
Washington University	3	–	5	.375	3	–	5	.375
† Conference championship winner

The 1908–09 Missouri Tigers men's basketball team represented the University of Missouri in the 1908–09 college basketball season. The team was led by first-year head coach Guy Lowman. The captain of the team was Carl Ristine.

Missouri finished with a 10–5 record overall and a 4–5 record in the Missouri Valley Intercollegiate Athletic Association. This was good enough for tie for second place in the regular season conference standings.

== Schedule and results ==
Date time, TV	Rank^{#}	Opponent^{#}	Result	Record	Site city, state
December 18, 1908*; N/A		Central Missouri	W 38–16	1–0	Columbia, Missouri
December 19, 1908*; N/A		Central Missouri	W 46–12	2–0	Columbia, Missouri
January 9, 1909; N/A		Iowa State	W 53–14	3–0 (1–0)	Columbia, Missouri
January 16, 1909; N/A		at Washington (MO)	L 25–34	3–1 (1–1)	St. Louis, Missouri
January 17, 1909; N/A		Washington (MO)	L 26–44	3–2 (1–2)	St. Louis, Missouri
January 22, 1909*; N/A		Missouri–Rolla	W 43–12	4–2 (1–2)	Columbia, Missouri
January 23, 1909*; N/A		Missouri–Rolla	W 49–22	5–2 (1–2)	Columbia, Missouri
February 1, 1909; N/A		at Nebraska	W 26–24	6–2 (2–2)	Lincoln, Nebraska
February 2, 1909*; N/A		at Kansas State	W 31–29	7–2 (2–2)	Manhattan, Kansas
February 3, 1909; N/A		at Kansas	L 15–24	7–3 (2–3)	Lawrence, Kansas
February 4, 1909; N/A		at Kansas	L 23–31	7–4 (2–4)	Lawrence, Kansas
February 6, 1909*; N/A		at Central Missouri	W 36–14	8–4 (2–4)	Warrensburg, Missouri
February 12, 1909; N/A		Kansas	L 19–24	8–5 (2–5)	Columbia, Missouri
February 13, 1909; N/A		Kansas	W 37–21	9–5 (3–5)	Columbia, Missouri
February 17, 1909; N/A		Washington (MO)	W 36–16	10–5 (4–5)	Columbia, Missouri
*Non-conference game. ^{#}Rankings from Coaches' Poll. (#) Tournament seedings in parentheses. All times are in Central Standard Time.
