= 1921–22 Holy Cross Crusaders men's basketball team =

American college basketball season

1921–22 Holy Cross Crusaders men's basketball
- Conference: Independent
- Record: 12–3
- Head coach: William J. Casey (3rd season)
- Captain: Dennis McLaughlin
- Home arena: Mechanics Hall; The Casino

The 1921–22 Holy Cross Crusaders men's basketball team represented The College of the Holy Cross during the 1921–22 NCAA men's basketball season. The head coach was William Casey, coaching the crusaders in his third season. The team finished with an overall record of 14–3.

== Schedule ==
Date time, TV	Opponent	Result	Record	Site city, state
12/14/1921*	at Providence	W 56–10	1–0	Providence, RI
12/16/1921*	Maine	W 48–19	2–0	Worcester, MA
12/27/1921*	at Crescent A.C.	L 26–30	2–1	Brooklyn, NY
12/28/1921*	at St. Francis	W 36–22	3–1	Brooklyn Heights, NY
12/29/1921*	at Brooklyn College	W 44–27	4–1	Brooklyn, NY
12/30/1921*	at C.C.N.Y.	W 29–27	5–1	New York, NY
1/06/1922*	Boston University	W 41–25	6–1	Worcester, MA
1/11/1922*	at Yale	W 31–24	7–1	Payne Whitney Gymnasium; New Haven, CT
1/13/1922*	Vermont	W 40–16	8–1	Worcester, MA
1/20/1922*	Harvard	W 40–22	9–1	The Casino; Worcester, MA
1/21/1922*	at Springfield	L 22–25	9–2	Springfield, MA
2/01/1922*	St. Francis (N.Y.)	W 37–33	10–2	Worcester, MA
2/03/1922*	Catholic	W 38–31	11–2	Worcester, MA
2/08/1922*	Springfield	W 50–25	12–2	Worcester, MA
2/17/1922*	Boston College	W 61–35	13–2	Worcester, MA
3/08/1922*	at Boston College	W 26–16	14–2	Girls' High School Gymnasium; Boston, MA
3/11/1922*	at Vermont	L 20–25	14–3	Burlington, VT
*Non-conference game. (#) Tournament seedings in parentheses.
