= 1908–09 Chicago Maroons men's basketball team =

American college basketball season

1908–09 Chicago Maroons men's basketball
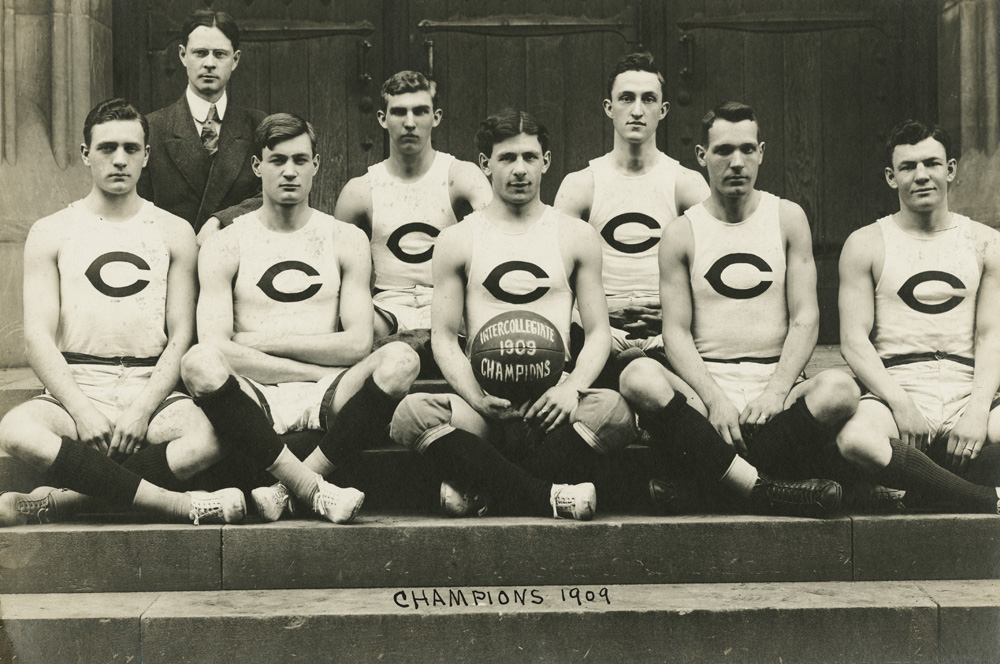

Western Conference Champions Helms Foundation National Champions
- Conference: Big Ten Conference
- Record: 12–0 (12–0 Western)
- Head coach: Joseph Raycroft (3rd season)
- Captain: William Georgen
- Home arena: Bartlett Gymnasium

1908–09 Western Conference men's basketball standings
	Conf.				Overall
Team	W		L	PCT	W		L	PCT
Chicago	12	–	0	1.000	12	–	0	1.000
Purdue	6	–	4	.600	8	–	4	.667
Wisconsin	5	–	4	.556	8	–	4	.667
Illinois	5	–	6	.455	7	–	6	.538
Minnesota	3	–	6	.333	8	–	6	.571
Indiana	2	–	6	.250	5	–	9	.357
Northwestern	1	–	4	.200	1	–	7	.125
Iowa	1	–	5	.167	8	–	7	.533

The 1908–09 Chicago Maroons men's basketball team represented the University of Chicago in intercollegiate basketball during the 1908–09 season. The team finished the season with a 12–0 record and won the Western Conference. The team was retroactively named the national champion by the Helms Athletic Foundation and was retroactively listed as the top team of the season by the Premo-Porretta Power Poll. This was the third consecutive season for which Chicago was later named the Helms national champion. The team played their home games on campus at Frank Dickinson Bartlett Gymnasium.

Both Pat Page and John Schommer were named All-Americans, while Schommer was also named the Helms Foundation National Player of the Year. For Schommer, it was his fourth consecutive All-American honor; for Page, it was his second (the following season, he would earn his third and also be named the Helms Foundation College Basketball Player of the Year).

== Roster ==
Player	Position	Class	Hometown
Joy Reichelt Clark	Guard	Sophomore	Omaha, NE
Alfred Crenshaw Kelly, Jr.	Guard	Sophomore	Ewing, IL
Edwin Powell Hubble	Forward	Junior	Marshfield, MO
Harlan "Pat" Page	Guard	Junior	Chicago, Illinois
Arthur Charles Hoffman	Guard	Junior	Chicago, Illinois
William Matthias Georgen, captain	Forward	Senior	Belvidere, IL
John Joseph Schommer	Center	Senior	Chicago, IL

- Head coach: Joseph Raycroft (3rd year at Chicago)

== Schedule ==
Date time, TV	Opponent	Result	Record	Site city, state
1/15/1909 no, no	vs. Indiana	W 18–12	1-0 (1-0)	Bartlett Gymnasium; Chicago, IL
1/23/1909 no, no	vs. Purdue	W 31–11	2-0 (2-0)	Bartlett Gymnasium; Chicago, IL
1/25/1909 no, no	@ Northwestern	W 28–4	3-0 (3-0)	Patten Gymnasium; Evanston, IL
1/28/1909 no, no	@ Iowa	W 29–10	4-0 (4-0)	Iowa Armory; Iowa City, IA
2/6/1909 no, no	@ Wisconsin	W 18–15	5-0 (5-0)	University of Wisconsin Armory and Gymnasium; Madison, WI
2/12/1909 no, no	vs. Minnesota	W 27–2	6-0 (6-0)	Bartlett Gymnasium; Chicago, IL
2/13/1909 no, no	@ Illinois	W 17–15	7-0 (7-0)	Kenney Gym; Urbana, IL
2/19/1909 no, no	@ Indiana	W 17–10	8-0 (8-0)	Old Assembly Hall; Bloomington, IN
2/20/1909 no, no	vs. Purdue	W 30–13	9-0 (9-0)	Bartlett Gymnasium; Chicago, IL
2/26/1909 no, no	vs. Illinois	W 23–10	10-0 (10-0)	Bartlett Gymnasium; Chicago, IL
3/6/1909 no, no	vs. Wisconsin	W 18–4	11-0 (11-0)	Bartlett Gymnasium; Chicago, IL
3/13/1909 no, no	@ Minnesota	W 20–15	12-0 (12-0)	University of Minnesota Armory; Minneapolis, MN
*Non-conference game. ^{#}Rankings from AP Poll. (#) Tournament seedings in parentheses. All times are in Central Time.

== Awards and honors ==
- John Schommer
  - Helms Foundation National Player of the Year
  - All-American
- Pat Page
  - All-American
