= 1921–22 Kent State Normal College men's basketball team =

American college basketball season

1921–22 Kent State Normal College men's basketball
- Conference: Independent
- Record: 1–7
- Head coach: Paul G. Chandler (3rd season)

The 1921–22 Kent State Normal College men's basketball team was the men's basketball team at what is now Kent State University in Kent, Ohio, then known as Kent State Normal College.

The men's basketball team played eight games in late 1921 and early 1922, finishing with a record of 1–7. It was the third year for coach Paul G. Chandler.

Ed. Evans served as team captain with Smith Line as manager. The roster also comprised Howard Shepherd, Ralph Rogers, Leroy Elker, Howard Evans, Harold Luxon and L.E. Hardy.

Games were held in various locations, such as the atrium of the original Administration Building (known as Cartwright Hall since 2006), in the basement of the original heating plant, and in the local Congregational Church gymnasium, as a permanent gymnasium was not built on campus until 1925.

== Schedule and results ==
Date time, TV	Opponent	Result	Record	Site city, state
*	Ashland	L 21–33	0–1	Kent, OH
*	Baldwin-Wallace	L 22–36	0–2	Kent, OH
January 26, 1922*	at Bowling Green	L 10–27	0-3	Bowling Green, OH
January 28, 1922*	Muncie State	L 27–44	0–4	Kent, OH
February 3, 1922*	Bowling Green	L 21–27	0–5	Kent, OH
*	Ramblers	L 18–28	0–6	Kent, OH
*	Alumni	W 24–16	1–6	Kent, OH
*	Ashland	L 25–36	1–7	Kent, OH
*Non-conference game. (#) Tournament seedings in parentheses. Source

== See also ==
- List of Kent State Golden Flashes men's basketball seasons
