= Joseph Stampf =

American basketball player and coach

Personal information
- Born: December 16, 1919 Chicago, Illinois, U.S.
- Died: April 20, 1985 (aged 65) Chicago Ridge, Illinois, U.S.
- Listed height: 6 ft 4 in (1.93 m)
- Listed weight: 210 lb (95 kg)

Career information
- High school: Calumet (Chicago, Illinois)
- College: Chicago (1940–1941)
- Position: Power forward / center

Career history

Playing
- 1942–1943: Acme Steel
- 1944–1945: Chicago American Gears

Coaching
- 1957–1975: Chicago

Joseph Michael Stampf (December 16, 1919 – April 20, 1985) was an American professional basketball player and college coach. He played for the Chicago American Gears in the National Basketball League during the 1944–45 season and averaged 3.0 points per game.

Stampf played college basketball at the University of Chicago, where in 1940–41 he led the Big Ten Conference in scoring despite his squad going winless. Years later, he became the program's head coach when he took over in 1957. In 18 seasons, Stampf compiled an overall record of 208–118, which through 2018–19 is the second-most wins in school history.

== Head coaching record ==
Record table
Season	Team	Overall	Conference	Standing	Postseason
Chicago Maroons (Independent) (1957–1975)
1957–58	Chicago	11–7			
1958–59	Chicago	13–6			
1959–60	Chicago	18–4			
1960–61	Chicago	19–4			
1961–62	Chicago	13–7			
1962–63	Chicago	14–5			
1963–64	Chicago	5–11			
1964–65	Chicago	7–8			
1965–66	Chicago	12–4			
1966–67	Chicago	9–8			
1967–68	Chicago	14–5			
1968–69	Chicago	7–10			
1969–70	Chicago	3–13			
1970–71	Chicago	7–8			
1971–72	Chicago	16–4			
1972–73	Chicago	15–4			
1973–74	Chicago	16–4			
1974–75	Chicago	9–6			
Total:		208–118 (.638)			
National champion Postseason invitational champion Conference regular season champion Conference regular season and conference tournament champion Division regular season champion Division regular season and conference tournament champion Conference tournament champion
