= H.W. Butterworth and Sons Company Building =

- U.S. National Register of Historic Places
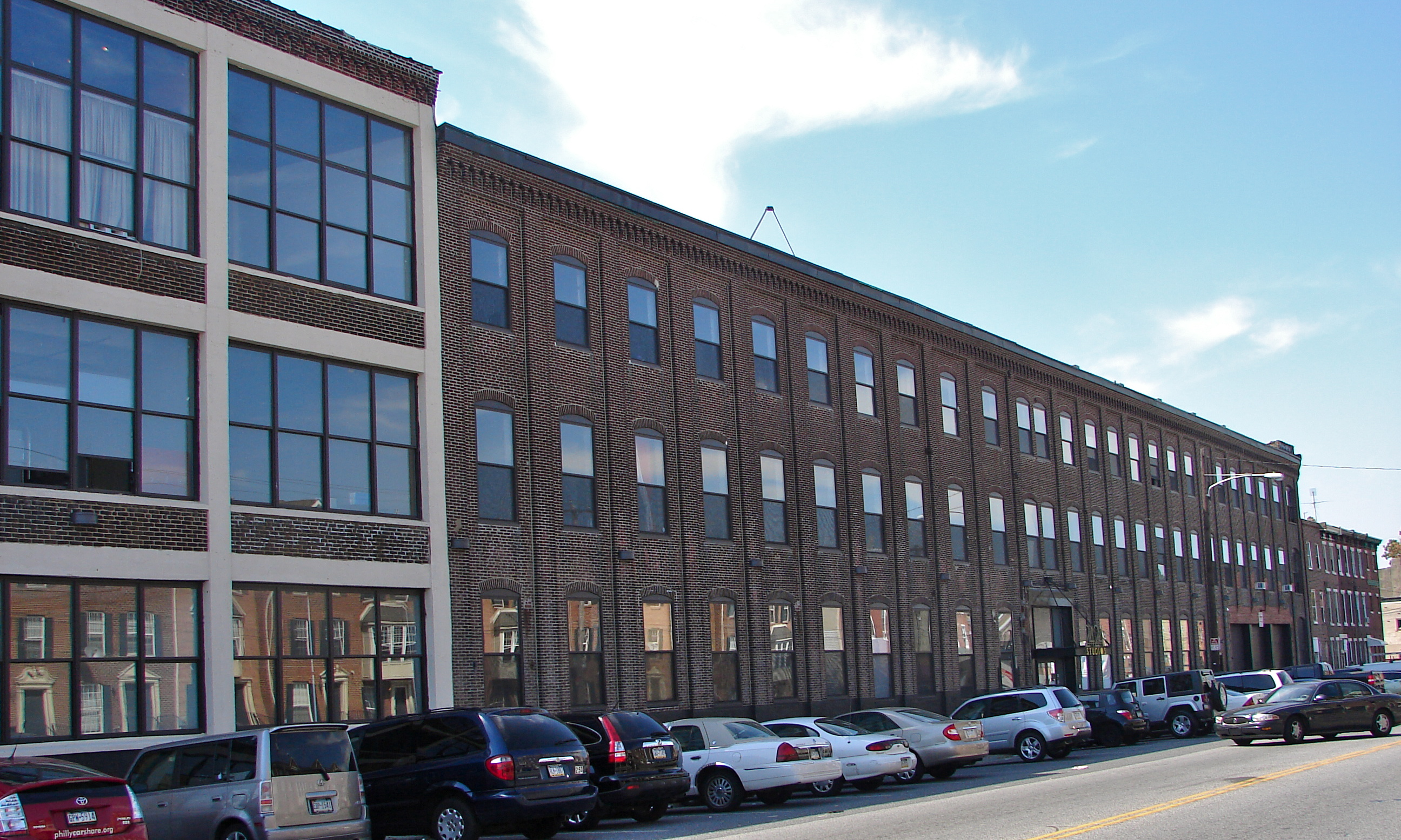
- H.W. Butterworth and Sons Company Building, September 2010

- Location within Philadelphia Location within Pennsylvania Location within the United States
- Location: 2410 East York St., Philadelphia, Pennsylvania
- Coordinates: 39°58′39″N 75°7′29″W
- Area: less than one acre
- Built: 1870, 1884, 1900, 1911, c. 1925
- Architectural style: Italianate
- NRHP reference No.: 10000406
- Added to NRHP: June 28, 2010

The H.W. Butterworth and Sons Company Building, now known as 2424 Studios, is a historic factory building which is located in the Fishtown neighborhood of Philadelphia, Pennsylvania.

It was added to the National Register of Historic Places in 2010 and was converted into studios in 2011.

== History and architectural features ==
Bilt in five phases between 1870 and 1925, the three earliest sections were designed in the Italianate style. The complex ranges from one to three-stories, and is constructed of brick and reinforced concrete.

The H.W. Butterworth and Sons Company manufactured textile machinery, and then, during World War II, built anti-aircraft machine gun parts.
