= Men's Gymnasium (University of Chicago) =

Athletic facility in Chicago, Illinois

University of Chicago Gymnasium
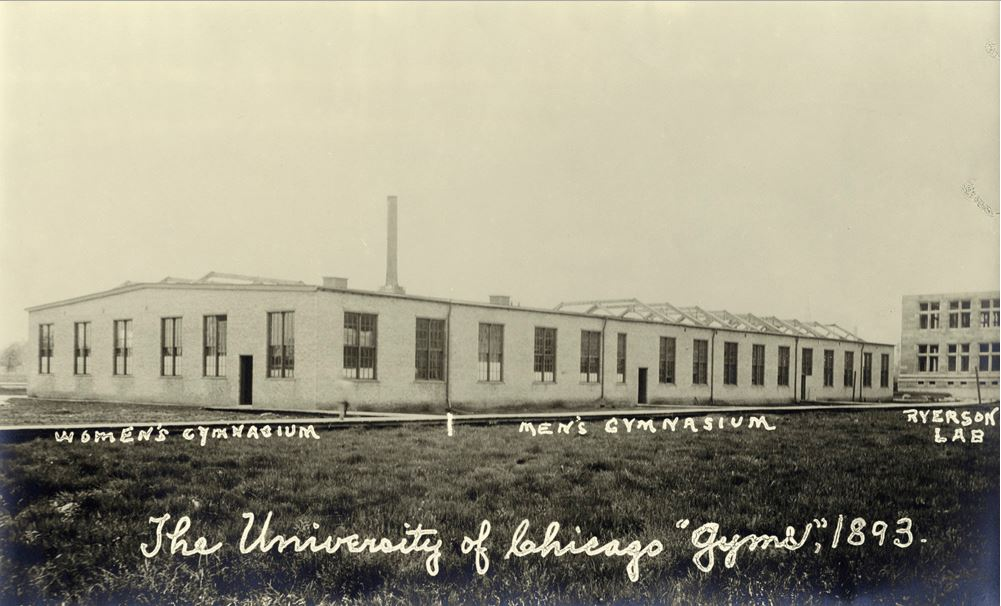
- Location: 5706 South University Avenue; Chicago, Illinois, United States
- Owner: University of Chicago
- Operator: University of Chicago

Construction
- Groundbreaking: October 1892
- Opened: 1893
- Closed: 1903
- Demolished: 1904
- Cost: $18,000

Tenants
- University Physical Education; Men's Basketball

University of Chicago Gymnasium is a former athletic facility on the campus of the University of Chicago in Chicago, Illinois, United States, that was demolished in 1904.

== Construction ==
Made from rough brick, construction of the building took place between October, 1891 and August, 1892 on land owned by the university. The cost of construction was approximately $18,000. The gymnasium was built with two divisions in order to separate activities devoted to men and women. The women's gymnasium was 100 feet by 50 feet, of which a portion was devoted to a locker room with dressing rooms and an office. The men's gymnasium was 200 feet by 50 feet and filled with equipment in order to train for baseball and track and field as well as handball courts, a tennis court and a one-twelfth of a mile track for running. The men's gymnasium also contained approximately 500 lockers.

The primary use for the gymnasium was a location that could be utilized for men's and women's physical education courses as well as being the facility for the Chicago Maroons men's basketball team to compete. The building also included a special room above the gym for physical examinations of students as well as a library room to maintain select books.

=== Temporary usage ===
The gymnasium was constructed to be a temporary structure with full knowledge that a permanent facility would be built. The university developed a plan to have a facility that would be a combination of a gymnasium and a diminutive athletic field under one roof. On Thanksgiving Day, 1901, the cornerstone of the Bartlett Memorial Gymnasium was laid during a ceremony.

On Friday, January 29, 1904, the formal opening of the Frank Dickinson Bartlett Gymnasium took place in front of 1,000 friends of the university, which included members of the faculty, alumni, student body, and university trustees. The dedication ceremony took place immediately following the annual football dinner hosted by President Harper.
