= 1921–22 Loyola Ramblers men's basketball team =

American college basketball season

1921–22 Loyola Ramblers men's basketball
- Conference: Independent
- Record: 0–6
- Head coach: Harry Rhodes (1st season)
- Home arena: none

The 1921–22 Loyola Ramblers men's basketball team represented Loyola University Chicago during the 1921–22 college men's basketball season. The ramblers were led by first-year head coach Harry Rhodes. The team had finished the season with a winless record of 0–6.

== Schedule ==
Date time, TV	Opponent	Result	Record	Site city, state
*	Lewis	L 20–24	0–1	Chicago, IL
*	Loras	L 15–37	0–2	Chicago, IL
*	Saint Louis	L 08–32	0–3	Chicago, IL
*	Valparaiso	L 11–33	0–4	Chicago, IL
*	Valparaiso	L 15–28	0–5	Chicago, IL
*	Lane College	L 05–33	0–6	Chicago, IL
*Non-conference game. (#) Tournament seedings in parentheses.
