= Charles Keinath =

American athlete (1886–1966)

Biographical details
- Born: November 13, 1886; Philadelphia, Pennsylvania, U.S.
- Died: April 18, 1966 (aged 79); Drexel Hill, Pennsylvania, U.S.

Playing career

Football
- 1908: Penn

Basketball
- 1905–1909: Penn
- Positions: Quarterback (football); Forward (basketball)

Coaching career (HC unless noted)

Basketball
- 1909–1912: Penn

Head coaching record
- Overall: 36–25

Accomplishments and honors

Championships
- Football: National (1908)

Awards
- Basketball: 4× NCAA All-American (1906–1909); Helms National Player of the Year (1908)

Charles "Kid" Keinath (November 13, 1886 – April 18, 1966) was an American college athlete who was a four-time All-American in basketball while at the University of Pennsylvania. He also won national championships in both basketball (1907–08) and football (1908) at Penn. In 1907–08, the basketball team finished 24–4 and was retroactively named the national champions by the Helms Athletic Foundation. Then, in 1908, the football team finished 11–0–1 and was named co-national champions with Harvard and LSU with Keinath leading the team as quarterback. He was team captain as a senior for the basketball team and led the Quakers to a 22-game winning streak that spanned between the 1907–08 and 1908–09 seasons.

Keinath was a native of Philadelphia, Pennsylvania, and attended Central High School, where he graduated in 1905. Aside from playing basketball and football at Penn, he also played on the school's baseball team, although his most personal success occurred while playing basketball. In addition to being selected an All-American all four years and winning a national championship, Keinath also led the Eastern Intercollegiate Basketball League in scoring during both his junior and senior seasons.

After graduating from the University of Pennsylvania in 1909, Keinath became the coach of the freshmen baseball and varsity men's basketball teams. He spent three seasons guiding the basketball team and compiled an overall record of 36–25, including a 12–14 record in conference play. Keinath also served as an assistant coach for the football team for 30 years.

== Head coaching record ==
Record table
| Season | Team | Overall | Conference | Standing | Postseason |
|---|---|---|---|---|---|
Penn Quakers (Eastern Intercollegiate Basketball League) (1909–1912)
| 1909–10 | Penn | 11–10 | 3–5 | 3rd | |
| 1910–11 | Penn | 15–8 | 3–5 | 2nd | |
| 1911–12 | Penn | 10–7 | 6–4 | 3rd | |
| Penn: | | 36–25 (.590) | 12–14 (.462) | | |
| Total: | | 36–25 (.590) | | | |
