= Fred Hengeveld =

American college sports coach

Biographical details
- Born: March 23, 1897; Palatka, Florida, U.S.
- Died: February 5, 1969 (aged 71); Davidson, North Carolina, U.S.

Coaching career (HC unless noted)

Basketball
- 1919–1922: Davidson

Baseball
- 1920–1922: Davidson

Head coaching record
- Overall: 20–20 (basketball); 23–26–1 (baseball)

Fred William "Dutch" Hengeveld (March 23, 1897 – February 5, 1969) was an American college sports coach. He was the head coach of Davidson College's men's basketball team between 1919–20 and 1921–22 and their baseball team between 1920 and 1922. He compiled a 20–20 overall record in basketball, while in baseball his record was 23–26–1.

Hengeveld played minor league baseball for the Little Rock Travelers of the Southern Association from 1919 through 1921. He also had a son, Fred Hengeveld Jr., who graduated from Davidson College in 1951 and then had a professional minor league in the St. Louis Cardinals organization from 1953 to 1958.

== Head coaching record ==
=== Basketball ===
Record table
| Season | Team | Overall | Conference | Standing | Postseason |
|---|---|---|---|---|---|
Davidson Wildcats (Independent) (1919–1922)
| 1919–1920 | Davidson | 3–10 | | | |
| 1920–1921 | Davidson | 7–7 | | | |
| 1921–1922 | Davidson | 10–3 | | | |
| Total: | | 20–20 | | | |
National champion Postseason invitational champion Conference regular season champion Conference regular season and conference tournament champion Division regular season champion Division regular season and conference tournament champion Conference tournament champion

=== Baseball ===
Record table
| Season | Team | Overall | Conference | Standing | Postseason |
|---|---|---|---|---|---|
Davidson Wildcats (Independent) (1920–1922)
| 1920 | Davidson | 8–9 | | | |
| 1921 | Davidson | 7–10–1 | | | |
| 1922 | Davidson | 8–7 | | | |
| Total: | | 23–26–1 | | | |
National champion Postseason invitational champion Conference regular season champion Conference regular season and conference tournament champion Division regular season champion Division regular season and conference tournament champion Conference tournament champion
