= J. Harold Brown =

American composer and musician (1902–1982)

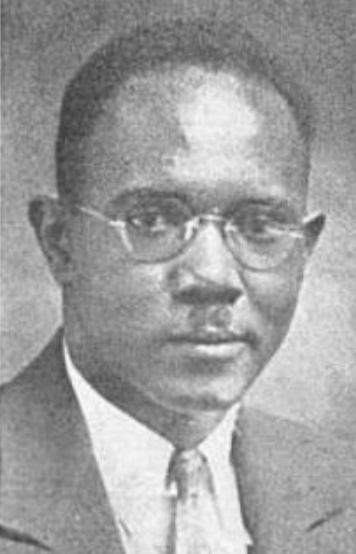
- Brown, from a 1930 publication
- Born: 1902; Lakeland, Florida, U.S.
- Died: September 17, 1982 (aged 79); Atlanta, Georgia, U.S.
- Occupations: Composer and musician

J. Harold Brown (1902 – September 17, 1982) was an American composer and musician best known for his production of The Saga of Zip Zan Rinkle, about a man who sleeps between 1948 and 1968 to witness large cultural changes in the United States. He trained the Karamu Quartet and traveled with Jimmie Lunceford's band. Brown was dean of music at Florida A&M University and taught in high schools and colleges in Atlanta, Cleveland, and Indianapolis.

== Personal life and death ==
Brown was born in Lakeland, Florida in 1902. He was married and had three daughters. Brown died in Atlanta, Georgia on September 17, 1982, at the age of 79.
