= 1908–09 Wisconsin Badgers men's basketball team =

American college basketball season

1908–09 Wisconsin Badgers men's basketball
- Conference: Big Ten Conference
- Record: 8–4 (5–4 Western)
- Head coach: Haskell Noyes
- Home arena: Red Gym

1908–09 Western Conference men's basketball standings
	Conf.				Overall
Team	W		L	PCT	W		L	PCT
Chicago	12	–	0	1.000	12	–	0	1.000
Purdue	6	–	4	.600	8	–	4	.667
Wisconsin	5	–	4	.556	8	–	4	.667
Illinois	5	–	6	.455	7	–	6	.538
Minnesota	3	–	6	.333	8	–	6	.571
Indiana	2	–	6	.250	5	–	9	.357
Northwestern	1	–	4	.200	1	–	7	.125
Iowa	1	–	5	.167	8	–	7	.533

The 1908–09 Wisconsin Badgers men's basketball team represented University of Wisconsin–Madison. The head coach was Haskell Noyes, coaching his first season with the Badgers. The team played their home games at the Red Gym in Madison, Wisconsin and was a member of the Western Conference.

== Schedule ==
Date time, TV	Rank^{#}	Opponent^{#}	Result	Record	Site city, state
Regular Season
12/19/1908*		Lawrence (WI)	W 53–13	1–0	Red Gym; Madison, WI
1/08/1909*		Ripon (WI)	W 36–12	2–0	Red Gym; Madison, WI
1/13/1909*		Beloit (WI)	W 52–4	3–0	Red Gym; Madison, WI
1/15/1909		at Purdue	L 20–23	3–1 (0–1)	Memorial Gymnasium; West Lafayette, IN
1/16/1909		at Illinois	L 16–28	3–2 (0–2)	Kenney Gym; Urbana, IL
1/23/1909		Illinois	W 20–10	4–2 (1–2)	Red Gym; Madison, WI
1/30/1909		at Minnesota	W 14–13	5–2 (2–2)	Minnesota Armory; Minneapolis, MN
2/06/1909		Chicago	L 15–18	5–3 (2–3)	Red Gym; Madison, WI
2/27/1909		Purdue	W 30–6	6–3 (3–3)	Red Gym; Madison, WI
3/01/1909		Iowa	W 30–9	7–3 (4–3)	Red Gym; Madison, WI
3/06/1909		at Chicago	L 4–18	7–4 (4–4)	Bartlett Gymnasium; Chicago, IL
3/09/1909		Minnesota	W 37–13	8–4 (5–4)	Red Gym; Madison, WI
*Non-conference game. ^{#}Rankings from AP Poll. (#) Tournament seedings in parentheses.
