= John Schommer =

American athlete and coach (1884–1960)

Personal information
- Born: January 29, 1884 Chicago, Illinois, U.S.
- Died: January 11, 1960 (aged 75)

Career information
- College: Chicago (1905–1909)
- Position: Center

Career history

Coaching
- 1910–1911: Chicago

Career highlights
- National player of the year (1909); 4× Consensus All-American (1906–1909); 3× First-team all-Western Conference (1907–1909); 3× Helms national champion (1907–1909); Univ. of Chicago Hall of Fame (2004)
- Basketball Hall of Fame
- Collegiate Basketball Hall of Fame

John Joseph Schommer (January 29, 1884 – January 11, 1960) was an American multi-sport athlete in the 1900s. He is considered by some to be the first basketball superstar and one of the first great all-around athletes. The Chicago, Illinois native was the first athlete in University of Chicago history to win 12 letters in American football, basketball, baseball and track. This earned him the nickname "Mr. Everything". Schommer was a four-time All-American in basketball and led the Maroons to three straight Big Ten championships (1907–09). He was named the Helms Foundation College Basketball Player of the Year for the 1908-09 season. One of his most famous moments was when he made an 80-foot field goal which helped lift Chicago over University of Pennsylvania in the final game of the 1907–08 regular season, winning them the championship. He was one of the first four players inducted to the Basketball Hall of Fame in 1959.
