= Eastern Intercollegiate Basketball League =

- Association: NCAA
- Founded: 1901
- Sports fielded: 1; men's: 1; women's: 0
- Division: Division I
- No. of teams: 4–8
- Region: Northeast

Locations

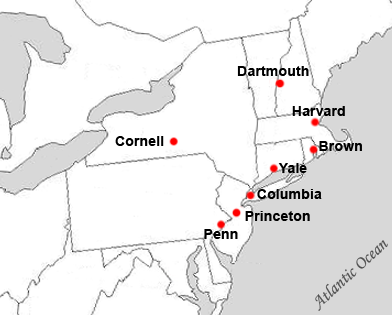
Locations of EIBL schools.

The Eastern Intercollegiate Basketball League was an athletic conference for men's college basketball, beginning with the 1901–02 season and ending with the 1954–55 season. Its membership ranged from four to eight members; all of these teams now compete in the Ivy League, which began play in 1955–56. The Ivy League's men's basketball league claims the EIBL's history as its own. Through the EIBL, the Ivy League is the oldest basketball conference in the National Collegiate Athletic Association; the next oldest, the Big Ten Conference, began play in 1905–06.

== Former members ==
Institution	Nickname	Year joined	Year departed (Note: No competition was being held in the EIBL from 1908–09 to 1909–10; and during the 1918–19 season due to World War I)	Division
Brown	Bears	1953–54	1954–55	North
Columbia	Lions	1901–02	1954–55	South
Cornell	Big Red	1901–02	1954–55	South
Dartmouth	Big Green	1911–12	1954–55	North
Harvard	Crimson	1901–02	1954–55 (Note: Harvard did not participate in the EIBL in 1904–05; from 1907–08 to 1932–33; and from 1943–44 to 1945–46)	North
Penn	Quakers	1903–04	1954–55	South
Princeton	Tigers	1901–02	1954–55 (Note: Princeton did not participate in the EIBL in 1944–45)	South
Yale	Bulldogs	1901–02	1954–55 (Note: Yale did not participate in the EIBL in 1912–13; and from 1943–44 to 1945–46)	North

== History ==
The league was founded in the 1901–02 season by five schools: Columbia University, Cornell University, Harvard University, Princeton University, and Yale University. The league adopted the double round robin format that has since become standard for college basketball conferences, with each team hosting every other team once and in turn being hosted by all of the others once. Yale won the initial championship with a 5–3 record.

The University of Pennsylvania was admitted to the league for the 1903–04 season, after securing temporary playing facilities. The championships during the first few years were evenly divided between Yale, Columbia, and Penn, with the Bulldogs winning three times, and the other two schools winning twice each. The league struggled in its first incarnation; there were many disagreements over the playing rules and eligibility, violent play was common, and on several occasions, teams failed to meet their obligation to play a complete league schedule. Harvard had particular difficulties due to limitations placed upon them by the school's faculty, which forced the squad to drop out of the league in 1904–05 and 1907–08 (and to stop playing altogether between 1908–1909 and 1919–20). These factors led to the collapse of the league, with no competition being held in 1908–09 or 1909–10.

The league was reorganized in 1910–11 under the leadership of Naismith Memorial Basketball Hall of Famer Ralph Morgan, with Columbia, Cornell, Penn, Princeton, and Yale participating. Dartmouth College joined the conference in 1911–12; Yale dropped out in 1912–13, but returned the following year. The conference remained stable at six teams from 1913–14 until 1932–33 (with a one-year suspension in 1918–19 for World War I). Columbia and Cornell were successful early in this period, with the Lions winning two championships, the Big Red one, and both sharing a fourth (the only time a first-place tie was not broken by a playoff game). The late nineteen-teens and early 1920s saw the rise of a great Penn team, winning three straight league championships and defeating the University of Chicago, champions of the Western Conference, in a best-of-three “national championship” series held at the end of the 1919–20 season. This string was interrupted by Princeton, who finished first in 1922 and 1923, and were themselves arguably national champions in 1925. The late 1920s and early 1930s were mostly divided between Columbia and Penn.

Harvard finally rejoined the league in 1933–34, bringing membership to seven teams. Harvard, Princeton, and Yale all suspended their participation for varying lengths of time during World War II, reducing the league to as few as four members in the 1944–45 season; however, all three quickly resumed their places in the league within two years of the war's end. The late 1930s and early 1940s saw the rise of a long-lived dynasty at Dartmouth, which won seven straight championships (still an EIBL/Ivy record) and made two trips to the finals of the new NCAA national championship tournament. By contrast, the post-war period produced a high degree of parity, with every team except Harvard winning at least once between 1945–46 and 1953–54.

During these years, the movement to officially form the Ivy League was gathering momentum, culminating in the 1954 extension of the institutions' formal agreement to govern football competition to include competition in all sports. As part of this process, Brown University joined the league for its final two seasons, and it was decided that the EIBL would be absorbed into the Ivy League beginning in 1955–56. The league came to an exciting conclusion in 1954–55, with Princeton emerging as the final champion from a three-way playoff with Columbia and Penn.

== League champions ==
Season	Champion	Record	Notes
1901–02	Yale	5–3	
1902–03	Yale	7–1	Yale retroactively declared national champions by the Helms Foundation.
1903–04	Columbia	10–0	Helms and Premo-Porretta national champions.
1904–05	Columbia	8–0	Helms and Premo-Porretta national champions.
1905–06	Pennsylvania	9–1	Dartmouth—Helms national champions.
1906–07	Yale	9–1	
1907–08	Pennsylvania	8–0	
1908–09	None	--	No league play.
1909–10	None	--	No league play.
1910–11	Columbia	7–1	Helms national champions.
1911–12	Columbia	8–2	
1912–13	Cornell	7–1	
1913–14	Columbia	8–2	Only co-champions in league history.
	Cornell	8–2	
1914–15	Yale	8–2	
1915–16	Pennsylvania	8–2	Defeated Princeton in playoff.
1916–17	Yale	9–1	
1917–18	Pennsylvania	9–1	
1918–19	None	--	League suspended due to World War I.
1919–20	Pennsylvania	10–0	Helms and Premo-Porretta national champions.
1920–21	Pennsylvania	9–1	Helms national champions.
1921–22	Princeton	8–2	Defeated Penn in playoff.
1922–23	Yale	7–3	
1923–24	Cornell	8–2	
1924–25	Princeton	9–1	Helms and Premo-Porretta national champions.
1925–26	Columbia	9–1	
1926–27	Dartmouth	7–3	Defeated Princeton in playoff.
1927–28	Pennsylvania	7–3	Defeated Princeton in playoff.
1928–29	Pennsylvania	8–2	
1929–30	Columbia	9–1	
1930–31	Columbia	10–0	
1931–32	Princeton	8–2	Defeated Columbia in playoff.
1932–33	Yale	8–2	
1933–34	Pennsylvania	10–2	
1934–35	Pennsylvania	10–2	Defeated Columbia in playoff.
1935–36	Columbia	12–0	
1936–37	Pennsylvania	12–0	
1937–38	Dartmouth	8–4	
1938–39	Dartmouth	10–2	Brown selected to inaugural NCAA tournament as independent—lost to Villanova in first round.
1939–40	Dartmouth	11–1	
1940–41	Dartmouth	10–2	Lost to Wisconsin in first round of NCAA's.
1941–42	Dartmouth	10–2	Defeated Princeton in playoff—lost to Stanford in finals of NCAA's.
1942–43	Dartmouth	11–1	Lost to DePaul in first round of NCAA's.
1943–44	Dartmouth	8–0	Lost to Utah in finals of NCAA's.
1944–45	Pennsylvania	5–1	
1945–46	Dartmouth	7–1	Harvard selected to NCAA's as independent—lost to Ohio St. in first round.
1946–47	Columbia	11–1	
1947–48	Columbia	11–1	Lost to Kentucky in first round of NCAA's.
1948–49	Yale	9–3	#11 in final AP poll; lost to Illinois in first round of NCAA's.
1949–50	Princeton	11–1	
1950–51	Columbia	12–0	#3 in final AP poll, #5 in UPI poll; lost to Illinois in first round of NCAA's.
1951–52	Princeton	10–2	Lost to Duquesne in first round of NCAA's.
1952–53	Pennsylvania	10–2	Received bye in first round of NCAA's; lost to Notre Dame in second round.
1953–54	Cornell	11–3	Defeated Princeton in playoff—received bye in first round of NCAA's, lost to Navy in second round.
1954–55	Princeton	10–4	Defeated Columbia in playoff, who had defeated Pennsylvania in an earlier playoff; received bye in first round of NCAA's, then lost to LaSalle in second round.

== Total championships ==
Team	Championships
Pennsylvania	13
Columbia	12
Dartmouth	9
Yale	8
Princeton	6
Cornell	4
Brown	0
Harvard	0
