= 1910 NCAA Men's Basketball All-Americans =

- Awarded for: 1909–10 IAAUS men's basketball season

The 1910 College Basketball All-American team, as chosen retroactively by the Helms Athletic Foundation. The player highlighted in gold was chosen as the Helms Foundation College Basketball Player of the Year retroactively in 1944.

Player	Team
William Broadhead	NYU
Leon Campbell	Colgate
Dave Charters	Purdue
William Copthorne	Army
Charles Eberle	Swarthmore
Samuel Harman	Rochester
Ted Kiendl	Columbia
Ernest Lambert	Oklahoma
W. Vaughn Lewis	Williams
Pat Page	Chicago

== See also ==
- 1909–10 IAAUS men's basketball season
