= 1909–10 Penn State Nittany Lions basketball team =

American college basketball season

1909–10 Penn State Nittany Lions men's basketball
- Conference: Independent
- Record: 8–6
- Head coach: student coaches
- Captain: Burke Hermann
- Home arena: Armory

1909–10 IAAUS men's basketball independents standings
	Conf.				Overall
Team	W		L	PCT	W		L	PCT
Columbia		–		–	11	–	0	1.000
Oklahoma		–		–	8	–	0	1.000
Virginia Tech		–		–	11	–	0	1.000
Wake Forest		–		–	1	–	0	1.000
Washburn		–		–	4	–	0	1.000
Whittier		–		–	8	–	0	1.000
Williams		–		–	11	–	0	1.000
Army		–		–	14	–	1	.933
Southwestern (Kan.)		–		–	13	–	1	.929
Grinnell		–		–	12	–	1	.923
Cotner		–		–	11	–	1	.917
Ohio State		–		–	11	–	1	.917
Navy		–		–	10	–	1	.909
Rochester (N.Y.)		–		–	17	–	2	.895
Fordham		–		–	16	–	2	.889
Canisius		–		–	15	–	2	.882
Southern California		–		–	21	–	3	.875
Central University (Ky.)		–		–	20	–	3	.870
Utah		–		–	17	–	3	.850
North Dakota Agricultural		–		–	11	–	2	.846
Brigham Young		–		–	9	–	2	.818
Niagara		–		–	13	–	3	.813
Washington State		–		–	12	–	3	.800
Kansas State		–		–	11	–	3	.786
Oberlin		–		–	10	–	3	.769
Vanderbilt		–		–	10	–	3	.769
New York University		–		–	13	–	4	.765
Lehigh		–		–	6	–	2	.750
LSU		–		–	3	–	1	.750
Seton Hall		–		–	6	–	2	.750
St. John's (N.Y.)		–		–	15	–	5	.750
Swarthmore		–		–	9	–	3	.750
Virginia		–		–	12	–	4	.750
Allegheny		–		–	8	–	3	.727
Notre Dame		–		–	10	–	4	.714
Marietta		–		–	7	–	3	.700
Washington		–		–	14	–	6	.700
Georgia		–		–	2	–	1	.667
Michigan State		–		–	10	–	5	.667
Montana State		–		–	6	–	3	.667
Rhode Island State		–		–	6	–	3	.667
Wisconsin–Stevens Point		–		–	2	–	1	.667
Auburn		–		–	11	–	6	.647
Colgate		–		–	9	–	5	.643
Wesleyan (Conn.)		–		–	9	–	5	.643
Wooster		–		–	7	–	4	.636
Akron		–		–	5	–	3	.625
St. Joseph's		–		–	5	–	3	.625
Baylor		–		–	8	–	5	.615
Illinois State		–		–	8	–	5	.615
Cincinnati		–		–	3	–	2	.600
CCNY		–		–	6	–	4	.600
Dartmouth		–		–	6	–	4	.600
Maine		–		–	6	–	4	.600
Miami (Ohio)		–		–	6	–	4	.600
Bloomsburg		–		–	7	–	5	.583
Bucknell		–		–	7	–	5	.583
Colorado		–		–	7	–	5	.583
Grove City		–		–	7	–	5	.583
Wabash		–		–	7	–	5	.583
Millikin		–		–	4	–	3	.571
Penn State		–		–	8	–	6	.571
Oregon Agricultural		–		–	7	–	3	.700
SUNY-Potsdam		–		–	11	–	9	.550
Cornell		–		–	7	–	6	.538
Princeton		–		–	7	–	6	.538
Pennsylvania		–		–	11	–	10	.524
Arizona		–		–	2	–	2	.500
Delaware		–		–	6	–	6	.500
Trinity (N.C.)		–		–	4	–	4	.500
Kalamazoo		–		–	2	–	2	.500
Oklahoma A&M		–		–	3	–	3	.500
Butler		–		–	3	–	4	.429
Saint Mary's (Calif.)		–		–	1	–	1	.500
Washington and Lee		–		–	6	–	6	.500
Wyoming		–		–	3	–	3	.500
Idaho		–		–	8	–	9	.471
Tennessee		–		–	7	–	8	.467
Bradley		–		–	6	–	7	.462
Denison		–		–	6	–	7	.462
Texas		–		–	6	–	7	.462
Dayton		–		–	5	–	6	.455
Gettysburg		–		–	5	–	6	.455
Mount Union		–		–	8	–	10	.444
Tulane		–		–	3	–	4	.429
Georgetown		–		–	5	–	7	.417
Davidson		–		–	2	–	3	.400
Detroit		–		–	2	–	3	.400
New Mexico		–		–	2	–	3	.400
North Dakota		–		–	4	–	6	.400
Temple		–		–	4	–	6	.400
New Mexico A&M		–		–	3	–	5	.375
Brown		–		–	5	–	9	.357
Colorado Agricultural		–		–	1	–	2	.333
Franklin		–		–	3	–	6	.333
Kentucky		–		–	4	–	8	.333
Lake Forest		–		–	3	–	6	.333
Manhattan		–		–	7	–	15	.318
Springfield (Mass.)		–		–	3	–	7	.300
Union (N.Y.)		–		–	3	–	7	.300
Utah State		–		–	3	–	7	.300
Nebraska Wesleyan		–		–	4	–	10	.286
Ohio		–		–	8	–	11	.421
Trinity (Conn.)		–		–	4	–	10	.286
VMI		–		–	2	–	5	.286
Yale		–		–	4	–	11	.267
William & Mary		–		–	8	–	11	.421
Fairmount		–		–	3	–	10	.231
Syracuse		–		–	3	–	11	.214
Carleton		–		–	1	–	4	.200
Indiana State		–		–	2	–	9	.182
Oregon		–		–	1	–	5	.167
Ole Miss		–		–	0	–	7	.000
Santa Clara		–		–	0	–	5	.000
South Carolina		–		–	0	–	1	.000
Rankings from AP Poll

The 1909–10 Penn State Nittany Lions basketball team represented Penn State University during the 1909–10 college men's basketball season. The team finished with a final record of 8–6.

== Schedule ==
Date time, TV	Opponent	Result	Record	Site city, state
12/10/1909*	Harrisburg Athletic Club	W 44–13	1–0	Armory; University Park, PA
12/15/1909*	at Pennsylvania	L 17–28	1–1	Philadelphia, PA
12/16/1909*	at Pratt Institute	W 24–19	2–1	
12/17/1909*	at Columbia	L 13–19	2–2	
12/18/1909*	at Army	L 20–22	2–3	West Point, NY
1/14/1910*	Wyoming Seminary	W 54–17	3–3	Armory; University Park, PA
1/20/1910*	Pittsburgh Collegians	L 37–40	3–4	Armory; University Park, PA
1/29/1910*	at Cornell	L 17–20	3–5	Ithaca, NY
2/7/1910*	Allegheny	W 34–20	4–5	Armory; University Park, PA
2/18/1910*	Swarthmore	W 20–17	5–5	Armory; University Park, PA
2/19/1910*	at Swarthmore	L 20–26	5–6	Swarthmore, PA
2/21/1910*	at Harrisburg Athletic Club	W 44–37	6–6	
2/24/1910*	Bucknell	W 53–13	7–6	Armory; University Park, PA
3/11/1910*	at Bucknell	W 23–10	8–6	Lewisburg, PA
*Non-conference game. (#) Tournament seedings in parentheses.
