= 1909–10 Georgetown Hoyas men's basketball team =

American college basketball season

1909–10 Georgetown Hoyas men's basketball
- Conference: Independent
- Record: 5–7
- Head coach: Maurice Joyce (3rd season)
- Captain: James Colliflower
- Home arena: Odd Fellows Hall

1909–10 IAAUS men's basketball independents standings
	Conf.				Overall
Team	W		L	PCT	W		L	PCT
Columbia		–		–	11	–	0	1.000
Oklahoma		–		–	8	–	0	1.000
Virginia Tech		–		–	11	–	0	1.000
Wake Forest		–		–	1	–	0	1.000
Washburn		–		–	4	–	0	1.000
Whittier		–		–	8	–	0	1.000
Williams		–		–	11	–	0	1.000
Army		–		–	14	–	1	.933
Southwestern (Kan.)		–		–	13	–	1	.929
Grinnell		–		–	12	–	1	.923
Cotner		–		–	11	–	1	.917
Ohio State		–		–	11	–	1	.917
Navy		–		–	10	–	1	.909
Rochester (N.Y.)		–		–	17	–	2	.895
Fordham		–		–	16	–	2	.889
Canisius		–		–	15	–	2	.882
Southern California		–		–	21	–	3	.875
Central University (Ky.)		–		–	20	–	3	.870
Utah		–		–	17	–	3	.850
North Dakota Agricultural		–		–	11	–	2	.846
Brigham Young		–		–	9	–	2	.818
Niagara		–		–	13	–	3	.813
Washington State		–		–	12	–	3	.800
Kansas State		–		–	11	–	3	.786
Oberlin		–		–	10	–	3	.769
Vanderbilt		–		–	10	–	3	.769
New York University		–		–	13	–	4	.765
Lehigh		–		–	6	–	2	.750
LSU		–		–	3	–	1	.750
Seton Hall		–		–	6	–	2	.750
St. John's (N.Y.)		–		–	15	–	5	.750
Swarthmore		–		–	9	–	3	.750
Virginia		–		–	12	–	4	.750
Allegheny		–		–	8	–	3	.727
Notre Dame		–		–	10	–	4	.714
Marietta		–		–	7	–	3	.700
Washington		–		–	14	–	6	.700
Georgia		–		–	2	–	1	.667
Michigan State		–		–	10	–	5	.667
Montana State		–		–	6	–	3	.667
Rhode Island State		–		–	6	–	3	.667
Wisconsin–Stevens Point		–		–	2	–	1	.667
Auburn		–		–	11	–	6	.647
Colgate		–		–	9	–	5	.643
Wesleyan (Conn.)		–		–	9	–	5	.643
Wooster		–		–	7	–	4	.636
Akron		–		–	5	–	3	.625
St. Joseph's		–		–	5	–	3	.625
Baylor		–		–	8	–	5	.615
Illinois State		–		–	8	–	5	.615
Cincinnati		–		–	3	–	2	.600
CCNY		–		–	6	–	4	.600
Dartmouth		–		–	6	–	4	.600
Maine		–		–	6	–	4	.600
Miami (Ohio)		–		–	6	–	4	.600
Bloomsburg		–		–	7	–	5	.583
Bucknell		–		–	7	–	5	.583
Colorado		–		–	7	–	5	.583
Grove City		–		–	7	–	5	.583
Wabash		–		–	7	–	5	.583
Millikin		–		–	4	–	3	.571
Penn State		–		–	8	–	6	.571
Oregon Agricultural		–		–	7	–	3	.700
SUNY-Potsdam		–		–	11	–	9	.550
Cornell		–		–	7	–	6	.538
Princeton		–		–	7	–	6	.538
Pennsylvania		–		–	11	–	10	.524
Arizona		–		–	2	–	2	.500
Delaware		–		–	6	–	6	.500
Trinity (N.C.)		–		–	4	–	4	.500
Kalamazoo		–		–	2	–	2	.500
Oklahoma A&M		–		–	3	–	3	.500
Butler		–		–	3	–	4	.429
Saint Mary's (Calif.)		–		–	1	–	1	.500
Washington and Lee		–		–	6	–	6	.500
Wyoming		–		–	3	–	3	.500
Idaho		–		–	8	–	9	.471
Tennessee		–		–	7	–	8	.467
Bradley		–		–	6	–	7	.462
Denison		–		–	6	–	7	.462
Texas		–		–	6	–	7	.462
Dayton		–		–	5	–	6	.455
Gettysburg		–		–	5	–	6	.455
Mount Union		–		–	8	–	10	.444
Tulane		–		–	3	–	4	.429
Georgetown		–		–	5	–	7	.417
Davidson		–		–	2	–	3	.400
Detroit		–		–	2	–	3	.400
New Mexico		–		–	2	–	3	.400
North Dakota		–		–	4	–	6	.400
Temple		–		–	4	–	6	.400
New Mexico A&M		–		–	3	–	5	.375
Brown		–		–	5	–	9	.357
Colorado Agricultural		–		–	1	–	2	.333
Franklin		–		–	3	–	6	.333
Kentucky		–		–	4	–	8	.333
Lake Forest		–		–	3	–	6	.333
Manhattan		–		–	7	–	15	.318
Springfield (Mass.)		–		–	3	–	7	.300
Union (N.Y.)		–		–	3	–	7	.300
Utah State		–		–	3	–	7	.300
Nebraska Wesleyan		–		–	4	–	10	.286
Ohio		–		–	8	–	11	.421
Trinity (Conn.)		–		–	4	–	10	.286
VMI		–		–	2	–	5	.286
Yale		–		–	4	–	11	.267
William & Mary		–		–	8	–	11	.421
Fairmount		–		–	3	–	10	.231
Syracuse		–		–	3	–	11	.214
Carleton		–		–	1	–	4	.200
Indiana State		–		–	2	–	9	.182
Oregon		–		–	1	–	5	.167
Ole Miss		–		–	0	–	7	.000
Santa Clara		–		–	0	–	5	.000
South Carolina		–		–	0	–	1	.000
Rankings from AP Poll

The 1909–10 Georgetown Hoyas men's basketball team represented Georgetown University during the 1909–10 NCAA Division I college basketball season. Maurice Joyce coached the team in his third season as head coach. Georgetown was an independent and for the last time played its home games at the Odd Fellows Hall at 8th and D Streets NW in downtown Washington, D.C. The team finished the season with a record of 5–7.

== Season recap ==
Georgetown University Law School student and forward Fred Rice completed his third and final season with the Hoyas. Injuries limited him to seven games, in which he scored 13 field goals and seven free throws for a total of 33 points and a 4.7-point-per-game average. He completed his 28-game Georgetown career with 247 points, and his 8.8-point-per-game average was the fifth highest among Georgetown players prior to World War II.

Sophomore forward-center Frank Schlosser's offensive production dropped from the previous year, but he nonetheless led the team in scoring for the second straight year. He played in 10 games and scored 67 points, averaging 6.7 points per game.

The team finished with a record of 5–7, the only losing record in Joyce's four-year tenure as head coach and, in fact, the only losing season in the first 19 seasons of Georgetown men's basketball history. The next losing season would not come until the 1925–26 team finished at 5–8.

== Roster ==
Georgetown players did not wear numbers on their jerseys this season. The first numbered jerseys in Georgetown men's basketball history would not appear until the 1933–34 season.

Forward and team captain James Colliflower, a Georgetown University Law School student and three-season letterman in his last year playing with the team, would later serve as Georgetown's head coach during the 1911–12, 1912–13, 1913–14, and 1921–22 seasons.

Name	Height	Weight (lbs.)	Position	Class	Hometown	Previous Team(s)
George Colliflower	N/A	N/A	F	Grad. Stud.	Washington, DC, U.S.	Georgetown Preparatory School (North Bethesda, MD)
James Colliflower	N/A	N/A	F	Grad. Stud.	Washington, DC, U.S.	Georgetown Preparatory School (North Bethesda, MD)
Richard Downey	N/A	N/A	C	Grad. Stud.	N/A	N/A
Frank Gibson	N/A	N/A	G	So.	Holyoke, MA, U.S.	University of Notre Dame
George Goggin	N/A	N/A	G	Sr.	N/A	N/A
Bill Martin	5'8"	N/A	F	Fr.	Washington, DC, U.S.	Georgetown Preparatory School (North Bethesda, MD)
J. Louis Monarch	N/A	N/A	G	So.	Boston, MA, U.S.	Boston College HS
John Regis	N/A	N/A	F	Sr.	N/A	N/A
Fred Rice	N/A	N/A	C	Grad. Stud.	Washington, DC, U.S.	George Washington University
Frank Schlosser	N/A	N/A	C	So.	Washington, DC, U.S.	United States Army

== 1909–10 schedule and results ==
It was common practice at this time for colleges and universities to include non-collegiate opponents in their schedules, with the games recognized as part of their official record for the season, and the games against Baltimore Medical College and the Washington YMCA all counted as part of Georgetown's won-loss record for 1909–10. It was not until 1952, after the completion of the 1951–52 season, that the National Collegiate Athletic Association (NCAA) ruled that colleges and universities could no longer count games played against non-collegiate opponents in their annual won-loss records.

Georgetown lost at Navy this season, the first of 15 straight losses to the Midshipmen. Georgetown's next victory over Navy would not take place until 1928.

Date time, TV	Opponent	Result	Record	Site city, state
Regular Season
Sat., Nov. 27, 1909 no, no	Baltimore Medical	W 25–15	1-0	Odd Fellows Hall; Washington, DC
Fri., Dec. 10, 1909 no, no	at Seton Hall	L 16–21	1-1	N/A; South Orange, NJ
Sat., Dec. 11, 1909 no, no	at Columbia	L 11–21	1-2	University Heights Gymnasium; New York, NY
Sun., Dec. 12, 1909 no, no	at New York University	L 16–31	1-3	N/A; New York, NY
Mon., Dec. 13, 1909 no, no	at St. John's	L 26–41	1-4	N/A; New York, NY
Tue., Dec. 28, 1909 no, no	at Columbia	cancelled		N/A; New York, NY
Thu., Dec. 30, 1909 no, no	at Yale	cancelled		N/A; New Haven, CT
Fri., Jan. 7, 1910 no, no	at City College of New York	cancelled		N/A; New York, NY
Tue., Jan. 11, 1910 no, no	at Manhattan	cancelled		N/A; New York, NY
Sat., Jan. 22, 1910 no, no	at Navy	L 25–37	1-5	Dahlgren Hall; Annapolis, MD
Wed., Jan. 26, 1910 no, no	Villanova	cancelled		Odd Fellows Hall; Washington, DC
Thu., Jan. 27, 1910 no, no	Mount St. Mary's	cancelled		Odd Fellows Hall; Washington, DC
Wed., Feb. 2, 1910 no, no	Virginia	W 32–20	2-5	Odd Fellows Hall; Washington, DC
Fri., Feb. 11, 1910 no, no	Delaware	cancelled		Odd Fellows Hall; Washington, DC
Sat., Feb. 12, 1910 no, no	at Army	L 17–48	2-6	N/A; West Point, NY
Sat., Feb. 19, 1910 no, no	Washington and Lee	cancelled		Odd Fellows Hall; Washington, DC
Tue., Feb. 22, 1910 no, no	at Delaware	cancelled		N/A; Newark, DE
Thu., Feb. 24, 1910 no, no	at Virginia	L 26–27	2-7	Fayerweather Gymnasium; Charlottesville, VA
Sat., Feb. 26, 1910 no, no	at Washington YMCA	W 34–19	3-7	YMCA Hall; Washington, DC
Thu., Mar. 3, 1910 no, no	Baltimore Medical	W 32–17	4-7	Odd Fellows Hall; Washington, DC
Sat., Mar. 5, 1910 no, no	Washington YMCA	W 19–12	5-7	Odd Fellows Hall; Washington, DC
*Non-conference game. (#) Tournament seedings in parentheses.
