= 1909–10 Bucknell Bison men's basketball team =

American college basketball season

1909–10 Bucknell Bison men's basketball
- Conference: Independent
- Record: 7–5
- Head coach: George Hoskins (2nd season)
- Captain: N.I. Craig
- Home arena: none

1909–10 IAAUS men's basketball independents standings
	Conf.				Overall
Team	W		L	PCT	W		L	PCT
Columbia		–		–	11	–	0	1.000
Oklahoma		–		–	8	–	0	1.000
Virginia Tech		–		–	11	–	0	1.000
Wake Forest		–		–	1	–	0	1.000
Washburn		–		–	4	–	0	1.000
Whittier		–		–	8	–	0	1.000
Williams		–		–	11	–	0	1.000
Army		–		–	14	–	1	.933
Southwestern (Kan.)		–		–	13	–	1	.929
Grinnell		–		–	12	–	1	.923
Cotner		–		–	11	–	1	.917
Ohio State		–		–	11	–	1	.917
Navy		–		–	10	–	1	.909
Rochester (N.Y.)		–		–	17	–	2	.895
Fordham		–		–	16	–	2	.889
Canisius		–		–	15	–	2	.882
Southern California		–		–	21	–	3	.875
Central University (Ky.)		–		–	20	–	3	.870
Utah		–		–	17	–	3	.850
North Dakota Agricultural		–		–	11	–	2	.846
Brigham Young		–		–	9	–	2	.818
Niagara		–		–	13	–	3	.813
Washington State		–		–	12	–	3	.800
Kansas State		–		–	11	–	3	.786
Oberlin		–		–	10	–	3	.769
Vanderbilt		–		–	10	–	3	.769
New York University		–		–	13	–	4	.765
Lehigh		–		–	6	–	2	.750
LSU		–		–	3	–	1	.750
Seton Hall		–		–	6	–	2	.750
St. John's (N.Y.)		–		–	15	–	5	.750
Swarthmore		–		–	9	–	3	.750
Virginia		–		–	12	–	4	.750
Allegheny		–		–	8	–	3	.727
Notre Dame		–		–	10	–	4	.714
Marietta		–		–	7	–	3	.700
Washington		–		–	14	–	6	.700
Georgia		–		–	2	–	1	.667
Michigan State		–		–	10	–	5	.667
Montana State		–		–	6	–	3	.667
Rhode Island State		–		–	6	–	3	.667
Wisconsin–Stevens Point		–		–	2	–	1	.667
Auburn		–		–	11	–	6	.647
Colgate		–		–	9	–	5	.643
Wesleyan (Conn.)		–		–	9	–	5	.643
Wooster		–		–	7	–	4	.636
Akron		–		–	5	–	3	.625
St. Joseph's		–		–	5	–	3	.625
Baylor		–		–	8	–	5	.615
Illinois State		–		–	8	–	5	.615
Cincinnati		–		–	3	–	2	.600
CCNY		–		–	6	–	4	.600
Dartmouth		–		–	6	–	4	.600
Maine		–		–	6	–	4	.600
Miami (Ohio)		–		–	6	–	4	.600
Bloomsburg		–		–	7	–	5	.583
Bucknell		–		–	7	–	5	.583
Colorado		–		–	7	–	5	.583
Grove City		–		–	7	–	5	.583
Wabash		–		–	7	–	5	.583
Millikin		–		–	4	–	3	.571
Penn State		–		–	8	–	6	.571
Oregon Agricultural		–		–	7	–	3	.700
SUNY-Potsdam		–		–	11	–	9	.550
Cornell		–		–	7	–	6	.538
Princeton		–		–	7	–	6	.538
Pennsylvania		–		–	11	–	10	.524
Arizona		–		–	2	–	2	.500
Delaware		–		–	6	–	6	.500
Trinity (N.C.)		–		–	4	–	4	.500
Kalamazoo		–		–	2	–	2	.500
Oklahoma A&M		–		–	3	–	3	.500
Butler		–		–	3	–	4	.429
Saint Mary's (Calif.)		–		–	1	–	1	.500
Washington and Lee		–		–	6	–	6	.500
Wyoming		–		–	3	–	3	.500
Idaho		–		–	8	–	9	.471
Tennessee		–		–	7	–	8	.467
Bradley		–		–	6	–	7	.462
Denison		–		–	6	–	7	.462
Texas		–		–	6	–	7	.462
Dayton		–		–	5	–	6	.455
Gettysburg		–		–	5	–	6	.455
Mount Union		–		–	8	–	10	.444
Tulane		–		–	3	–	4	.429
Georgetown		–		–	5	–	7	.417
Davidson		–		–	2	–	3	.400
Detroit		–		–	2	–	3	.400
New Mexico		–		–	2	–	3	.400
North Dakota		–		–	4	–	6	.400
Temple		–		–	4	–	6	.400
New Mexico A&M		–		–	3	–	5	.375
Brown		–		–	5	–	9	.357
Colorado Agricultural		–		–	1	–	2	.333
Franklin		–		–	3	–	6	.333
Kentucky		–		–	4	–	8	.333
Lake Forest		–		–	3	–	6	.333
Manhattan		–		–	7	–	15	.318
Springfield (Mass.)		–		–	3	–	7	.300
Union (N.Y.)		–		–	3	–	7	.300
Utah State		–		–	3	–	7	.300
Nebraska Wesleyan		–		–	4	–	10	.286
Ohio		–		–	8	–	11	.421
Trinity (Conn.)		–		–	4	–	10	.286
VMI		–		–	2	–	5	.286
Yale		–		–	4	–	11	.267
William & Mary		–		–	8	–	11	.421
Fairmount		–		–	3	–	10	.231
Syracuse		–		–	3	–	11	.214
Carleton		–		–	1	–	4	.200
Indiana State		–		–	2	–	9	.182
Oregon		–		–	1	–	5	.167
Ole Miss		–		–	0	–	7	.000
Santa Clara		–		–	0	–	5	.000
South Carolina		–		–	0	–	1	.000
Rankings from AP Poll

The 1909–10 Bucknell Bison men's basketball team represented Bucknell University during the 1909–10 NCAA men's basketball season. The head coach was George Hoskins, coaching the Bison in his second season. The Bison's team captain was N.I. Craig.

== Schedule ==
Date time, TV	Opponent	Result	Record	Site city, state
1/14/1910*	Susquehanna	W 45–16	1–0	Lewisburg, PA
1/28/1910*	Albright	W 34–22	2–0	Lewisburg, PA
1/31/1910*	George Washington	W 49–17	3–0	Lewisburg, PA
2/8/1910*	Allegheny	L 20–48	3–1	Lewisburg, PA
2/11/1910*	at Dickinson	W 38–17	4–1	Lewisburg, PA
2/17/1910*	Alumni	W 20–17	5–1	Lewisburg, PA
2/22/1910*	Swarthmore	W 16–13 ^{OT}	6–1	Lewisburg, PA
2/25/1910*	Gettysburg	W 26–18	7–1	Lewisburg, PA
3/4/1910*	at Dickinson	L 16–18	7–2	Carlisle, PA
3/5/1910*	at Gettysburg	L 17–46	7–3	Gettysburg, PA
3/12/1910*	at State College	L 13–52	7–4	Armory; University Park, PA
3/15/1910*	State College	L 10–23	7–5	Lewisburg, PA
*Non-conference game. (#) Tournament seedings in parentheses.
