= 1909–10 Georgia Bulldogs basketball team =

American college basketball season

1909–10 Georgia Bulldogs basketball
- Conference: Southern Intercollegiate Athletic Association
- Record: 2–1 (1–1 SIAA)
- Head coach: C. O. Heidler (3rd season)
- Captain: Howell Peacock
- Home arena: Athens YMCA

1909–10 IAAUS men's basketball independents standings
| | Conf. | | | | Overall |
| Team | W | | L | PCT | W | | L | PCT |
|---|---|---|---|---|---|---|---|---|
| Columbia | | – | | – | 11 | – | 0 | 1.000 |
| Oklahoma | | – | | – | 8 | – | 0 | 1.000 |
| Virginia Tech | | – | | – | 11 | – | 0 | 1.000 |
| Wake Forest | | – | | – | 1 | – | 0 | 1.000 |
| Washburn | | – | | – | 4 | – | 0 | 1.000 |
| Whittier | | – | | – | 8 | – | 0 | 1.000 |
| Williams | | – | | – | 11 | – | 0 | 1.000 |
| Army | | – | | – | 14 | – | 1 | .933 |
| Southwestern (Kan.) | | – | | – | 13 | – | 1 | .929 |
| Grinnell | | – | | – | 12 | – | 1 | .923 |
| Cotner | | – | | – | 11 | – | 1 | .917 |
| Ohio State | | – | | – | 11 | – | 1 | .917 |
| Navy | | – | | – | 10 | – | 1 | .909 |
| Rochester (N.Y.) | | – | | – | 17 | – | 2 | .895 |
| Fordham | | – | | – | 16 | – | 2 | .889 |
| Canisius | | – | | – | 15 | – | 2 | .882 |
| Southern California | | – | | – | 21 | – | 3 | .875 |
| Central University (Ky.) | | – | | – | 20 | – | 3 | .870 |
| Utah | | – | | – | 17 | – | 3 | .850 |
| North Dakota Agricultural | | – | | – | 11 | – | 2 | .846 |
| Brigham Young | | – | | – | 9 | – | 2 | .818 |
| Niagara | | – | | – | 13 | – | 3 | .813 |
| Washington State | | – | | – | 12 | – | 3 | .800 |
| Kansas State | | – | | – | 11 | – | 3 | .786 |
| Oberlin | | – | | – | 10 | – | 3 | .769 |
| Vanderbilt | | – | | – | 10 | – | 3 | .769 |
| New York University | | – | | – | 13 | – | 4 | .765 |
| Lehigh | | – | | – | 6 | – | 2 | .750 |
| LSU | | – | | – | 3 | – | 1 | .750 |
| Seton Hall | | – | | – | 6 | – | 2 | .750 |
| St. John's (N.Y.) | | – | | – | 15 | – | 5 | .750 |
| Swarthmore | | – | | – | 9 | – | 3 | .750 |
| Virginia | | – | | – | 12 | – | 4 | .750 |
| Allegheny | | – | | – | 8 | – | 3 | .727 |
| Notre Dame | | – | | – | 10 | – | 4 | .714 |
| Marietta | | – | | – | 7 | – | 3 | .700 |
| Washington | | – | | – | 14 | – | 6 | .700 |
| Georgia | | – | | – | 2 | – | 1 | .667 |
| Michigan State | | – | | – | 10 | – | 5 | .667 |
| Montana State | | – | | – | 6 | – | 3 | .667 |
| Rhode Island State | | – | | – | 6 | – | 3 | .667 |
| Wisconsin–Stevens Point | | – | | – | 2 | – | 1 | .667 |
| Auburn | | – | | – | 11 | – | 6 | .647 |
| Colgate | | – | | – | 9 | – | 5 | .643 |
| Wesleyan (Conn.) | | – | | – | 9 | – | 5 | .643 |
| Wooster | | – | | – | 7 | – | 4 | .636 |
| Akron | | – | | – | 5 | – | 3 | .625 |
| St. Joseph's | | – | | – | 5 | – | 3 | .625 |
| Baylor | | – | | – | 8 | – | 5 | .615 |
| Illinois State | | – | | – | 8 | – | 5 | .615 |
| Cincinnati | | – | | – | 3 | – | 2 | .600 |
| CCNY | | – | | – | 6 | – | 4 | .600 |
| Dartmouth | | – | | – | 6 | – | 4 | .600 |
| Maine | | – | | – | 6 | – | 4 | .600 |
| Miami (Ohio) | | – | | – | 6 | – | 4 | .600 |
| Bloomsburg | | – | | – | 7 | – | 5 | .583 |
| Bucknell | | – | | – | 7 | – | 5 | .583 |
| Colorado | | – | | – | 7 | – | 5 | .583 |
| Grove City | | – | | – | 7 | – | 5 | .583 |
| Wabash | | – | | – | 7 | – | 5 | .583 |
| Millikin | | – | | – | 4 | – | 3 | .571 |
| Penn State | | – | | – | 8 | – | 6 | .571 |
| Oregon Agricultural | | – | | – | 7 | – | 3 | .700 |
| SUNY-Potsdam | | – | | – | 11 | – | 9 | .550 |
| Cornell | | – | | – | 7 | – | 6 | .538 |
| Princeton | | – | | – | 7 | – | 6 | .538 |
| Pennsylvania | | – | | – | 11 | – | 10 | .524 |
| Arizona | | – | | – | 2 | – | 2 | .500 |
| Delaware | | – | | – | 6 | – | 6 | .500 |
| Trinity (N.C.) | | – | | – | 4 | – | 4 | .500 |
| Kalamazoo | | – | | – | 2 | – | 2 | .500 |
| Oklahoma A&M | | – | | – | 3 | – | 3 | .500 |
| Butler | | – | | – | 3 | – | 4 | .429 |
| Saint Mary's (Calif.) | | – | | – | 1 | – | 1 | .500 |
| Washington and Lee | | – | | – | 6 | – | 6 | .500 |
| Wyoming | | – | | – | 3 | – | 3 | .500 |
| Idaho | | – | | – | 8 | – | 9 | .471 |
| Tennessee | | – | | – | 7 | – | 8 | .467 |
| Bradley | | – | | – | 6 | – | 7 | .462 |
| Denison | | – | | – | 6 | – | 7 | .462 |
| Texas | | – | | – | 6 | – | 7 | .462 |
| Dayton | | – | | – | 5 | – | 6 | .455 |
| Gettysburg | | – | | – | 5 | – | 6 | .455 |
| Mount Union | | – | | – | 8 | – | 10 | .444 |
| Tulane | | – | | – | 3 | – | 4 | .429 |
| Georgetown | | – | | – | 5 | – | 7 | .417 |
| Davidson | | – | | – | 2 | – | 3 | .400 |
| Detroit | | – | | – | 2 | – | 3 | .400 |
| New Mexico | | – | | – | 2 | – | 3 | .400 |
| North Dakota | | – | | – | 4 | – | 6 | .400 |
| Temple | | – | | – | 4 | – | 6 | .400 |
| New Mexico A&M | | – | | – | 3 | – | 5 | .375 |
| Brown | | – | | – | 5 | – | 9 | .357 |
| Colorado Agricultural | | – | | – | 1 | – | 2 | .333 |
| Franklin | | – | | – | 3 | – | 6 | .333 |
| Kentucky | | – | | – | 4 | – | 8 | .333 |
| Lake Forest | | – | | – | 3 | – | 6 | .333 |
| Manhattan | | – | | – | 7 | – | 15 | .318 |
| Springfield (Mass.) | | – | | – | 3 | – | 7 | .300 |
| Union (N.Y.) | | – | | – | 3 | – | 7 | .300 |
| Utah State | | – | | – | 3 | – | 7 | .300 |
| Nebraska Wesleyan | | – | | – | 4 | – | 10 | .286 |
| Ohio | | – | | – | 8 | – | 11 | .421 |
| Trinity (Conn.) | | – | | – | 4 | – | 10 | .286 |
| VMI | | – | | – | 2 | – | 5 | .286 |
| Yale | | – | | – | 4 | – | 11 | .267 |
| William & Mary | | – | | – | 8 | – | 11 | .421 |
| Fairmount | | – | | – | 3 | – | 10 | .231 |
| Syracuse | | – | | – | 3 | – | 11 | .214 |
| Carleton | | – | | – | 1 | – | 4 | .200 |
| Indiana State | | – | | – | 2 | – | 9 | .182 |
| Oregon | | – | | – | 1 | – | 5 | .167 |
| Ole Miss | | – | | – | 0 | – | 7 | .000 |
| Santa Clara | | – | | – | 0 | – | 5 | .000 |
| South Carolina | | – | | – | 0 | – | 1 | .000 |
Rankings from AP Poll

The 1909–10 Georgia Bulldogs basketball team represented the University of Georgia as a member of the Southern Intercollegiate Athletic Association (SIAA) during the 1909–10 IAAUS men's basketball season. Led by C. O. Heidler in his third and final season as head coach, the Bulldogs compiled an overall record of 2–1 with a mark of 1–1 in conference play.

== Schedule ==
| Date time, TV | Opponent | Result | Record | Site city, state |
|---|---|---|---|---|
| * | Auburn | W 40–35 | 1–0 | Athens YMCA; Athens, GA |
| * | A.A.C. | W 57–45 | 2–0 | Athens YMCA; Athens, GA |
| * | at Auburn | L 21–56 | 2–1 | The Gymnasium; Auburn, AL |
*Non-conference game. (#) Tournament seedings in parentheses.
