= 1909–10 Auburn Tigers men's basketball team =

American college basketball season

1909–10 Auburn Tigers men's basketball
- Conference: Southern Intercollegiate Athletic Association
- Record: 11–6 (3–1 SIAA)
- Head coach: Mike Donahue (5th season)
- Captain: Schley Gordy
- Home arena: The Gymnasium

The 1909–10 Auburn Tigers men's basketball team represented Auburn University during the 1909–10 college basketball season. The head coach was Mike Donahue, coaching his fifth season with the Tigers.

== Schedule ==
Date time, TV	Opponent	Result	Record	Site city, state
*	Wetumpka Athletic Club	W 56–12	1–0	The Gymnasium; Auburn, AL
*	at Columbus YMCA	L 8–44	1–1	Columbus, GA
	at Mercer	W 38–20	2–1	Macon, GA
	Georgia	L 35–40	2–2	Athens YMCA; Athens, GA
*	Atlanta Athletic Club	L 23–44	2–3	
	Mercer	W 56–19	3–3	The Gymnasium; Auburn, AL
*	Bessemer Athletic Club	W 26–18	4–3	The Gymnasium; Auburn, AL
*	at Birmingham Athletic Club	L 31–33	4–4	Birmingham, AL
*	at Bessemer Athletic Club	W 23–10	5–4	Bessemer, AL
*	at Birmingham YMCA	L 12–23	5–5	Birmingham, AL
*	Birmingham H.S.	W 29–16	6–5	The Gymnasium; Auburn, AL
	Georgia	W 56–21	7–5	The Gymnasium; Auburn, AL
*	Birmingham Ath. Club	W 31–19	8–5	The Gymnasium; Auburn, AL
*	Montgomery YMCA	W 24–16	9–5	The Gymnasium; Auburn, AL
*	Columbus YMCA	L 16–42	9–6	The Gymnasium; Auburn, AL
*	at Montgomery YMCA	W 26–17	10–6	Montgomery, AL
*	at Birmingham Ath. Club	W 26–19	11–6	Birmingham, AL
*Non-conference game. (#) Tournament seedings in parentheses.
