= 1909–10 Central University men's basketball team =

American college basketball season

1909–10 Centre Colonels men's basketball

SIAA champion
- Conference: Southern Intercollegiate Athletic Association
- Record: 20–3 (2–1 SIAA)
- Head coach: M. B. Banks
- Captain: Thornton Mason

The 1909–10 Central University men's basketball team represented Centre College during the 1909–10 college basketball season. The team was led by brothers William and Louis Seelbach, the sons of the man who founded the Seelbach Hotel. The team posted a 20–3 record. The team beat Kentucky 87–17.
