= 1920 Prohibition National Convention =

- 1920 presidential election

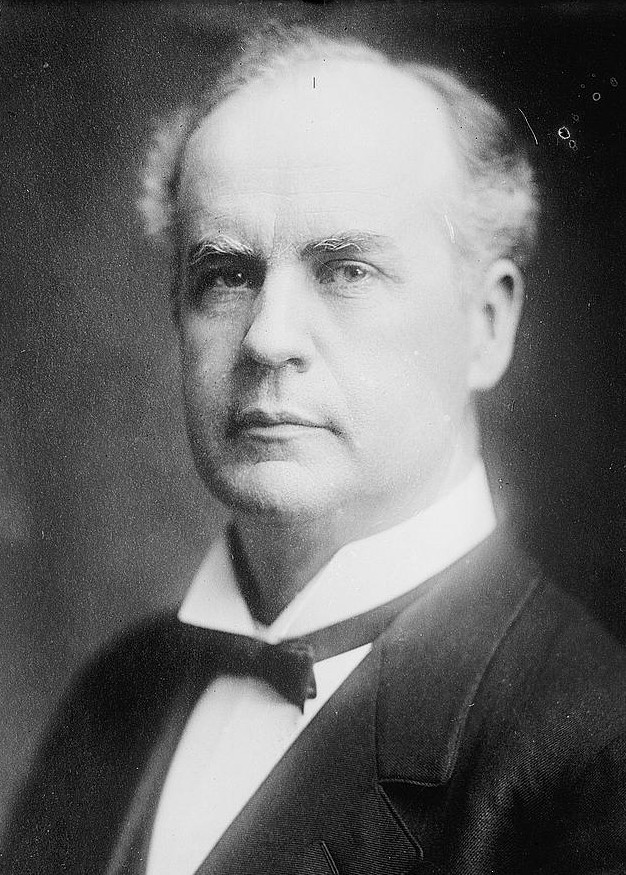
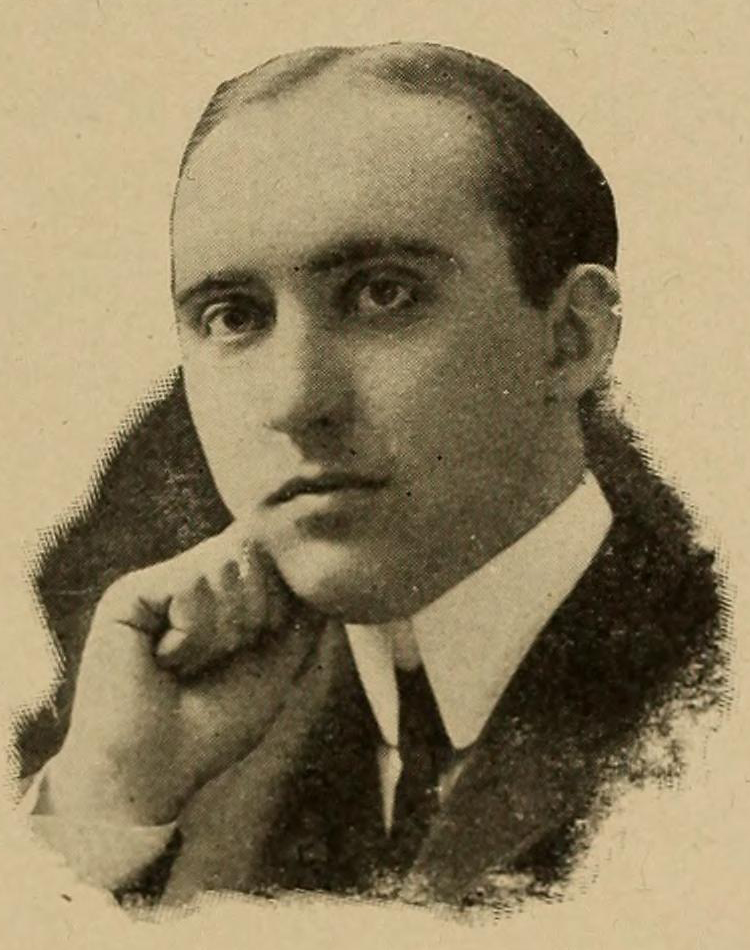
- Nominees (Watkins & Colvin)

Convention
- Date(s): July 21–22, 1920
- City: Lincoln, Nebraska
- Venue: City Auditorium
- Keynote speaker: Aaron S. Watkins

Candidates
- Presidential nominee: Aaron S. Watkins of Ohio
- Vice-presidential nominee: D. Leigh Colvin of New York

The 1920 Prohibition National Convention was held in Lincoln, Nebraska, July 21–22, 1920. The convention nominated Aaron S. Watkins for president and D. Leigh Colvin for vice president. It was the party's first convention during prohibition, which had realized the party's long goal of national temperance law through the ratification of the Eighteenth Amendment to the United States Constitution and the enactment of the Volstead Act.

== Logistics ==
The convention was the party's thirteenth national convention, and its first to be held during prohibition, with the party having obtained a goal of national temperance law with the Eighteenth Amendment to the United States Constitution and the Volstead Act.

The convention was held July 21–22, 1920 at the City Auditorium in Lincoln, Nebraska. It featured more than 250 delegates from across the United States.

The state of Nebraska had been the final state necessary to pass the Eighteenth Amendment for its ratification, and the staging of a convention there acted as a form of celebration of its ratification. It is one of very few national presidential nominating conventions ever to be held in the city of Lincoln. The city is relatively central in its geographic location in the Continental United States, and had good connections to population centers by intercity passenger rail. The city was regarded to be generally supportive of temperance, and had a large number of churches that led to one its nicknames at the time being "The Holy City". Its metro area had numerous institutions of higher education. One of its universities was the public University of Nebraska. Additionally, the metro area had several pro-temperance private religious colleges in its surrounding suburbs, including Nebraska Christian University in Bethany (later renamed "Cotner College"), Union Adventist University in College View, and Nebraska Wesleyan University in University Place.

The convention took place after the 1920 Republican National Convention and 1920 Democratic National Convention, both of which had been held in June. The Prohibition convention attracted a level of national interest.

== Nominations ==
On the first day of the convention, delegates attempted to draft non-party members William Jennings Bryan (three-time Democratic nominee) and Billy Sunday (both national figures who were generally supportive of temperance (Note: Bryan personally was a teetotaler, and had voiced his view that prohibition would benefit society. But it was never a top political reform he had supported. His earlier political record between 1887 and 1910 had been more opposed to prohibitionist legislation than supportive of it, but at the 1910 Nebraska State Convention he endorsed temperance legislation)), respectively to be the party's presidential and for vice presidential nominee. Party leaders were intent on nominating Bryan for president regardless of whether or not he would agree to accept the nomination. The national committee of the party met with his brother, Charles W. Bryan, in an informal conference at which they were informed that William Jennings Bryan had no interest in running as their nominee. The Bryans instead recommended that the party altogether forgo nominating its own presidential ticket, and instead focus its 1920 mission on electing pro-temperance candidates to congress. Sunday also declared that he would decline the party's nomination.

Ultimately, Bryan's refusal to run motivated the party to instead nominate Aaron S. Watkins for president. The convention nominated New York Prohibition Party politician D. Leigh Colvin for vice president. The two men were much less well-known than the party's previously hoped-for nominees of Bryan and Sunday.

Presidential balloting			Vice-Presidential balloting	
	1st ballot	2nd ballot		1st ballot
Aaron S. Watkins	85.0	108.0	D. Leigh Colvin	108.0
Robert H. Patton	85.0	74.0	Herman P. Faris	47.0
Daniel A. Poling	28.0	24.0	Frank S. Regan	15.0
Charles H. Randall	9.0	2.0	James H. Woertendyke	12.0

== Notable speakers ==
Opening remarks were delivered by Party Chairman Virgil Hinshaw.

Prior to his nomination, Watkins delivered the keynote address.
