= Cotner College =

Christian college in Lincoln, Nebraska, US (1889–1933)

Coordinates: 40.83166°N 96.63029°W

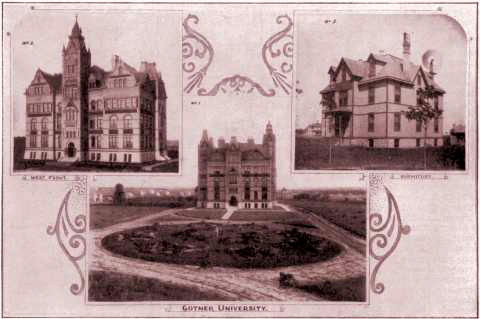
- 1904
- Former name: Nebraska Christian University
- Active: 1889–1933
- Religious affiliation: Disciples of Christ
- Location: Lincoln, Nebraska
- Colors: Royal blue and white
- Nickname: Bulldogs
- Location within Nebraska Location within the United States

Cotner College, also known as Nebraska Christian University, is a former religious college located in present-day Lincoln, Nebraska, which was founded in 1889 by the Nebraska Christian Missionary Alliance.

== History ==
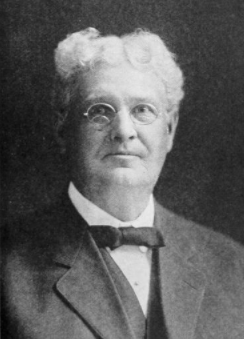
Samuel Cotner

In 1886, several local businessmen marketed 300 acres of land as free real estate for a college, hoping that a town would form around the college and increase the property value of their adjacent land holdings. In 1888, the Nebraska Christian Missionary Alliance, an affiliate of the Disciples of Christ, obtained the land and founded Nebraska Christian University in 1889. The following year, in 1890, the institution was renamed Cotner College in honor of Omaha resident Samuel Cotner, a major donor to the college. The town of Bethany Heights formed around the college and was incorporated in 1890.

Both the college and the town remained small – Cotner College opened with a class of 30 students in 1889 and by 1900, Bethany Heights had a population of only 360, despite being a suburb of Lincoln which in the same year had 37,000 residents. Despite its small size, Cotner College was ambitious in its courses, being one of few colleges to offer studies in medicine and dentistry at the time. Cotner College also offered courses in religious and biblical studies, education, business, and liberal arts.

Bethany Heights was annexed by Lincoln in 1926, and Cotner College closed Bethany Heights location in 1933. However, Cotner College as an institution continued to exist in various forms, such as the Cotner School of Religion which operated two locations, one opened in 1945 across the street from the University of Nebraska–Lincoln's East Campus and the other opened in 1954 across the street from the University of Nebraska–Lincoln's Downtown Campus. These locations allowed UNL students to minor in religious studies through dual enrollment at both Cotner and the University of Nebraska. Upon the closure of its Bethany Heights location, the medical and dental departments were given over to the University of Nebraska, creating the foundation for those departments at the university.

== Legacy ==
Aylesworth Hall, the main building of Cotner College, was demolished in the early 1950s and the land was sold off as individual residential lots. However, the former dormitory still stands and is currently used as an apartment building.

== Notable alumni and faculty ==
- Clarence G. Miles (1887–1959), prominent local attorney and 35th mayor of Lincoln, attended Cotner College.
- Henry Howard Bagg (1853–1928), calendar artist, taught at Cotner College from 1902 to 1916.
- Lewis Worthington Smith, English professor

== See also ==
- Bethany, Nebraska
- James A. Beattie House
- History of Lincoln, Nebraska
- University of Nebraska–Lincoln
- College View, Nebraska
- Union College (Nebraska)
- Neighborhoods in Lincoln, Nebraska
