= Walter Lively =

American civil rights activist

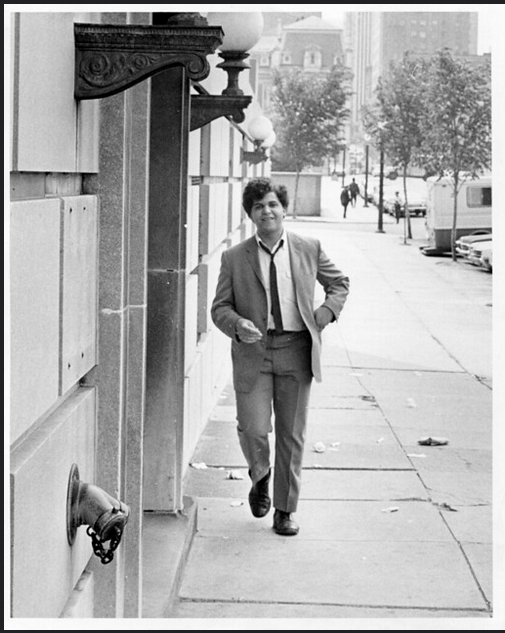
Lively, c. 1968

Walter Hall Lively Jr. (August 27, 1942 – September 10, 1976) was an African American civil rights and socialist activist in Baltimore, Maryland. A key figure in the Black Power and Black Arts Movements in Baltimore, Lively founded and headed several important organizations devoted to Black liberation and ending poverty. According to the Baltimore Sun, “National civil rights leaders publicly predicted he would be Baltimore’s first Black mayor.” His unexpected death at age 34 abruptly ended his political career.

== Early life and education ==
Lively was born in Philadelphia, Pennsylvania, on August 27, 1942, to Walter Lively and Lillian Blake. He was the oldest of five children. Walter Lively Sr., who was a bombardier-navigator with the 477th Bomber Squadron ("Red Tails," Tuskegee Airmen) and graduating from the University of Pennsylvania (Wharton, 1950) worked as an accountant. With alcohol taking over his life, Walter Sr. left the family, forcing them to go on welfare. They moved to the Tasker Homes, a public housing project in the Grays Ferry neighborhood of the South Philadelphia section of Philadelphia.

At 12 years old, he began working for a huckster, or man who sold produce from a cart, eventually taking over for the older man. When he was 14 he helped black newspaper delivery boys in his neighborhood organize a successful picket line against the local newspaper distributor who paid them low wages beginning his career as a community organizer.

Lively graduated from South Philadelphia High School in 1960. After graduation, he worked in construction and as a lab technician at the University of Pennsylvania where he also attended night school.

== Civil rights activism ==
Civil rights activists fought against segregation and discrimination around the nation through the 1950s and 1960s. In 1961, Lively joined hundreds of black and white activists targeting segregated businesses along Route 40, which went through Maryland, by conducting sit-ins at these establishments. A few months earlier, African dignitaries traveling to Washington, DC, found themselves barred from eating at restaurants along the route. International attention and pressure were applied to the federal government to eliminate this discrimination. The Lagos Daily Times of Nigeria wrote, “the United States forfeits its claim to world leadership,” due to this mistreatment. Lively was arrested during the Route 40 sit-ins. In 1962, the Baltimore city council outlawed segregation in hotels and restaurants, with Maryland following suit nine months later.

Following the Route 40 protest, Lively returned to Philadelphia. At the University of Pennsylvania, he joined the Student Peace Union and helped organize local chapters of the NAACP and the Congress of Racial Equality. At 21 years old, he was chosen to be the Philly director for the March on Washington.

== Community organizing ==
Lively moved to Baltimore, Maryland, in 1963 or 1964. In 1964, Students for a Democratic Society, one of the major national organizations of college student activists, began their Economic Research and Action Project in cities nationwide, including Baltimore. ERAP sent student organizers to live in impoverished areas to mobilize poor people to become more active politically and fight for policies that would better their lives. In deeply segregated Baltimore, there were two ERAP offices, one with white organizers focused on poor white communities and another with Black organizers, including Lively, which focused on Black east Baltimore. According to Jennifer Frost, “Most of the black activists involved, like Bob Moore and Walter Lively, felt that white organizers would not be effective among African Americans.” The Baltimore project chose the name UJOIN, or Union for Jobs or Income Now, to reflect their commitment to organizing unemployed people.

== U-JOIN ==
Under Lively's leadership, U-JOIN became one of the most radical activist organizations in Baltimore's Black community. Baltimore Sun reporter James Dilts describes U-JOIN as “a potentially revolutionary group because it's committed to letting the people decide. It's a militant group because it's biased toward working, poor, black people. It's a radical group because it wants democratic control and basic change.” While U-JOIN worked on several issues, its focus was always on empowering impoverished and working-class Black people and confronting state institutions that oppressed them.

In 1964, President Lyndon Johnson announced a massive federal government effort to end poverty. Called the War on Poverty, it created a new agency, the Office of Economic Opportunity, which distributed money to local offices to fight poverty in their area. In Baltimore, these decisions were made by the Community Action Agency and its board of directors, the Community Action Commission, and were based on A Plan for Action, a blueprint for how to spend the antipoverty funds in Baltimore.

In early 1965, U-JOIN created an alternative to A Plan for Action, which put poor people themselves in charge of decision-making. Their plan included a Non-Profit Housing Association, a Neighborhood Job Corps, and a Neighborhood Commons, and would be organized through neighborhood groups that would send representatives to area councils and the city's council. The city council ignored U-JOIN's plan and passed its own program, though some funds were given to U-JOIN for its programs. U-JOIN and other Black civil rights organizations joined to create the Anti-Poverty Action Committee, which charged that the CAA and Commission did not represent Baltimore's Black communities because they didn't include residents from those neighborhoods and enough Black people. Demonstrating their intersectional approach to these issues, U-JOIN critiqued the appointment of Buddy Young, a Black former Colts football player, to the antipoverty commission, because he didn't represent working-class and unemployed Black Baltimore residents and had missed several meetings. Young was forced to resign.

In 1966, U-JOIN, under Lively, founded Mother Rescuers from Poverty, an organization of women on welfare who advocated for better treatment and living conditions. It was the first welfare rights organization in Baltimore. The group organized rent strikes against private landlords, leading to the formation of Tenants for Justice in Housing, which pushed for rent escrow legislation that allowed tenants to withhold rent if their living conditions were poor. Tenants for Justice in Housing also held a rent strike. In addition to working with women on welfare, Lively also organized drives to register voters in predominantly Black East Baltimore, fought to ban dangerous potbelly stoves in apartments, and organized cleanups of neighborhood parks.

== Political campaign ==
After organizing in the 2nd district of East Baltimore for years, Lively was frustrated that only white candidates were running to represent the predominantly Black area in 1967. Although Lively's political views were quite radical, he decided to run for the seat as a Republican. Baltimore was controlled by the Democratic party who, Lively felt, had not responded to poor Black people's needs. His run as a Republican didn't represent a change of heart, but a strategic ploy by Lively. The Republican party saw an opportunity to reach new voters through Lively. The Republican candidate for the 2nd district withdrew from the race to allow Lively to get on the ballot. Lively later said his campaign only cost $30. His opponents distributed “scurrilous racial literature” about him in the run-up to election day. He lost by 3600 votes, a remarkably low number in Baltimore which had not “chosen a Republican for City Council since before World War II.”

== Political beliefs ==
Lively inspired many people in Baltimore into activism. He called his vision of activism “responsible radicalism.” Based on organizing poor people to find collective power to fight for political policies that reflected their needs, it drew from the New Left, the early Civil Rights Movement, and Black Power. He believed that once sparked, people could make lasting changes where they lived that would grow outward and affect the broader society. Reflecting these beliefs, civil rights activist Bob Moore and Lively worked together to create the Black United Front “as a vehicle to prevent white leaders from splitting the black community along traditional class and ideological lines.” At an event commemorating the first anniversary of the Baltimore police raid on the Black Panther Party headquarters in the city, lively argued “We have not yet successfully developed a relationship with the mass of black people. Revolutions are made by people...The struggle has had armchair revolutionaries for too long.”

Although he was a “member of Norman Thomas’s Socialist Party,” Lively was “registered as an independent” politically, suggesting his pragmatism. While he was a socialist and those ideals undergirded his activism, he understood that to raise funds and gain enough political clout to be taken seriously by Baltimore's Black and white political leaders, he had to be aware of his public persona. When journalist James Dilts profiled Lively in the Baltimore Sun magazine, he noted that in 1965 Lively had a beard and long hair, but when he ran for city council, he cut his hair and began wearing a suit. Such surface details demonstrate Lively's awareness of how to navigate politics. As Ta-Nehisi Coates recounts in his memoir, “Lively had an instinct for the inside, and was thus adept at moving the gears of power in the proper direction.”

== Riot and after ==
After the assassination of Martin Luther King Jr., in April 1968, Baltimore, like many cities, experienced a riot or uprising. As a well-known Black activist in the neighborhoods where the riot was happening, Lively tried to calm things down. However, police arrested him because they said he was suspicious in areas where arson had taken place. The charges were later dropped.

Soon after the riot, Lively was appointed director of the Urban Coalition, a partnership between business, religious, labor, and local government groups to address issues of unemployment, bad housing, and poor schools. However, conservative members of the Baltimore city council attacked Lively because of his arrest during the riot and demanded that the council decrease its contribution to the Urban Coalition by the amount of Lively's salary as director ($13,000). Lively resigned less than six months later in support of another Black civil rights activist, Walter P. Carter, who was not appointed as director of Baltimore's antipoverty program.

Following his stint with the Urban Coalition, Lively went on to work in union organizing. He was the head of the Concerned Citizens’ Committee in support of striking sanitation workers in September 1968. The strikers won collective bargaining power increases the power of the unions in Baltimore.

By 1968, “Lively had been jailed 22 times, the longest for 6 days in North Carolina. When asked what he was doing in NC, he said, “We were trying to become free.”

In the early 1970s, Lively began working on issues related to mass incarceration. He is involved in the creation of the Harriet Tubman Prison Movement, with the Black cultural nationalist SOUL School, Black Panther Party, and the Detroit-based International Black Workers Congress. The organization described itself as based on the principle of “class struggle” and believed that most of the inmates in MD jails are “political prisoners” because they are “victims of economic conditions.”

== Cultural activism ==
In the late 1960s, Lively founded a print shop and publishing company called Liberation House at 432 E. North Avenue, which was followed by a bookstore with the same name in the early 1970s. The print shop printed material for various groups involved in civil rights and Black Power activities and trained young men in how to use the machines. In 1968, during the uprising following the assassination of Martin Luther King Jr. in Baltimore, Liberation Press printed leaflets to distribute to store owners in Black neighborhoods urging them to close their stores to honor King's death. It even printed the student newspaper of the Community College of Baltimore. In 1974, Liberation House Press published Baltimore poet Melvin E. Brown's book, In the First Place. According to author Ta-Nehisi Coates, Lively's press inspired his father, Paul Coates, former Black Panther Party leader, to open his own bookstore and publishing company, Black Classic Press, which continues to this day.

Lively also founded a Black museum in Baltimore in the early 1970s. He created the Baltimore Neighborhood Commons Corporation to help develop cultural and community facilities. This group received grants which they used to purchase a former Enoch Pratt Free Library Branch at 816 North Broadway in 1971. Called the Black Community Museum, it was modeled after the Anacostia Community Museum. According to participants, the Museum hosted a theater group and writing workshops. It offered events as well, including a talk by Reverend Vernon Dobson. A newspaper reporter in 1976, however, found the museum building vacant.

== Death ==
Lively receded from public life in the mid-1970s. According to a friend quoted in his obituary, “He was at the head of the parade, but the parade passed him by. Something happened...something happened and I don't know what it was.”

Lively died on September 11, 1976, from an aneurysm, at Johns Hopkins University Hospital. He was 34 years old.

Maryland State Representative Clarence Mitchell III said of Walter Hall Lively, “He was the life of a black revolutionary who sought, at the sacrifice of his own comfort to bring about permanent change.”
