= James A. Beattie House =

- U.S. National Register of Historic Places
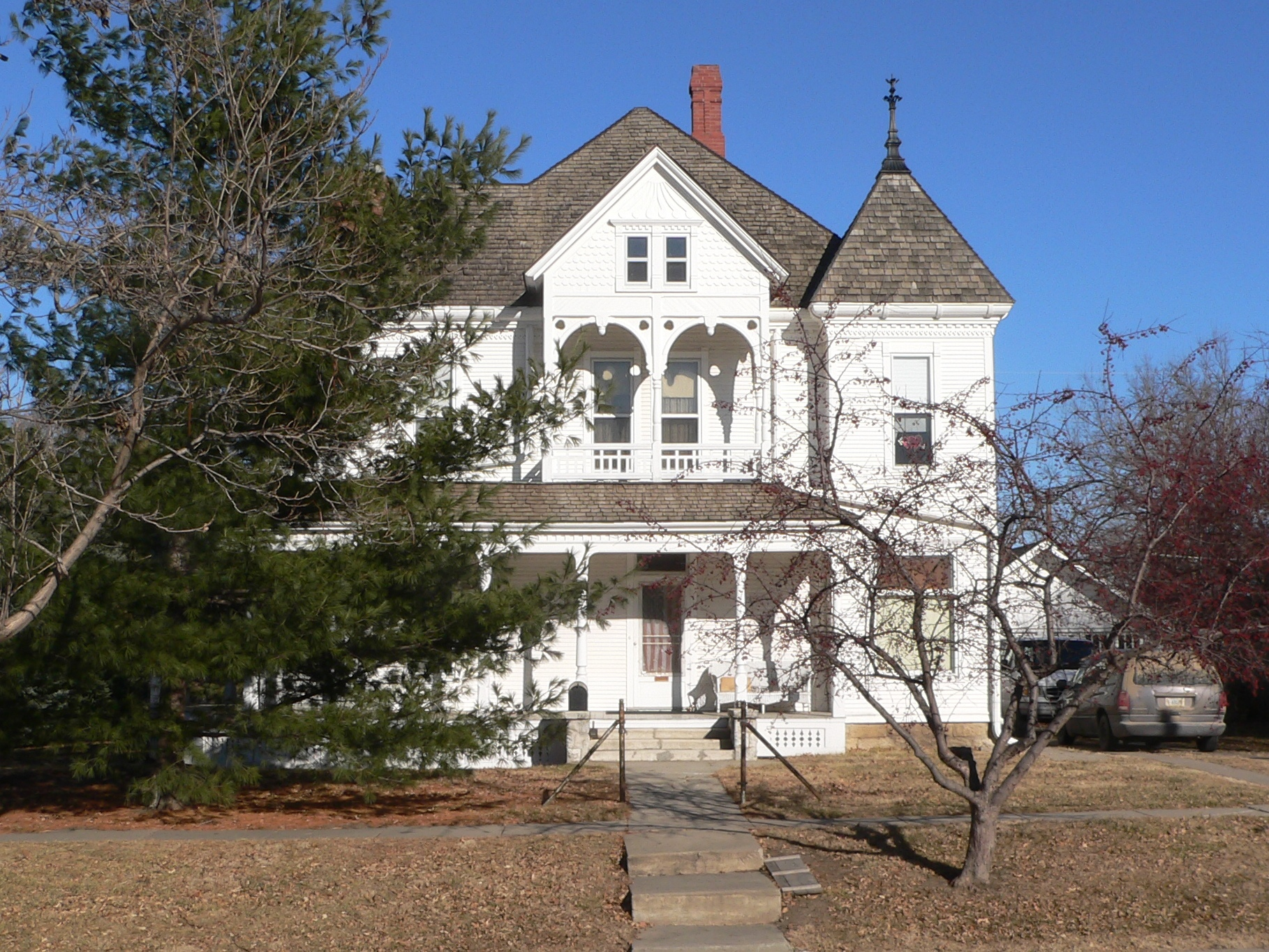
- James A. Beattie House, seen from the south
- Location: 6706 Colby St. Lincoln, Nebraska
- Coordinates: 40°50′00.2″N 96°37′43.5″W
- Area: Less than one acre
- Built: 1892
- Architectural style: Queen Anne
- NRHP reference No.: 90001773
- Added to NRHP: 23 October 1990

The James A. Beattie House, also known as the Beattie Miles House, is a Queen Anne style home built in the Bethany Heights neighborhood of Lincoln, Nebraska, in 1892. The James A. Beattie House is listed on the National Register of Historic Places for its architecture as well as its historical connection with the settlement of the region.

== History ==
The James A. Beattie House is the last remaining building associated with Cotner College and the original settlement of Bethany Heights. Cotner College, originally called Nebraska Christian University, was founded in 1889 by the Nebraska Christian Missionary Alliance on 300 acres of donated land. James A. Beattie, president of the Nebraska Christian Education Board, purchased three lots across the street from the college in 1889. However, Beattie did not build his house--located on the center lot, directly across from the north entrance of the main building of Cotner College--until 1892 when he was named president of the college.

In 1901, Beattie sold the home to Samuel A. Miles, a Nebraska pioneer. Samuel Miles' thirteen-year-old son, Clarence G. Miles, grew up in the home and later attended Cotner College. Clarence went on to study at Harvard Law School before being elected Mayor of Lincoln in 1947. Bethany voted to be annexed by the city of Lincoln in 1922, Cotner College closed its Bethany location in 1933, and the Miles family sold the Beattie House in 1945. After annexation and the closure of the college, most of the original buildings of the Bethany area were lost.

== Gallery ==
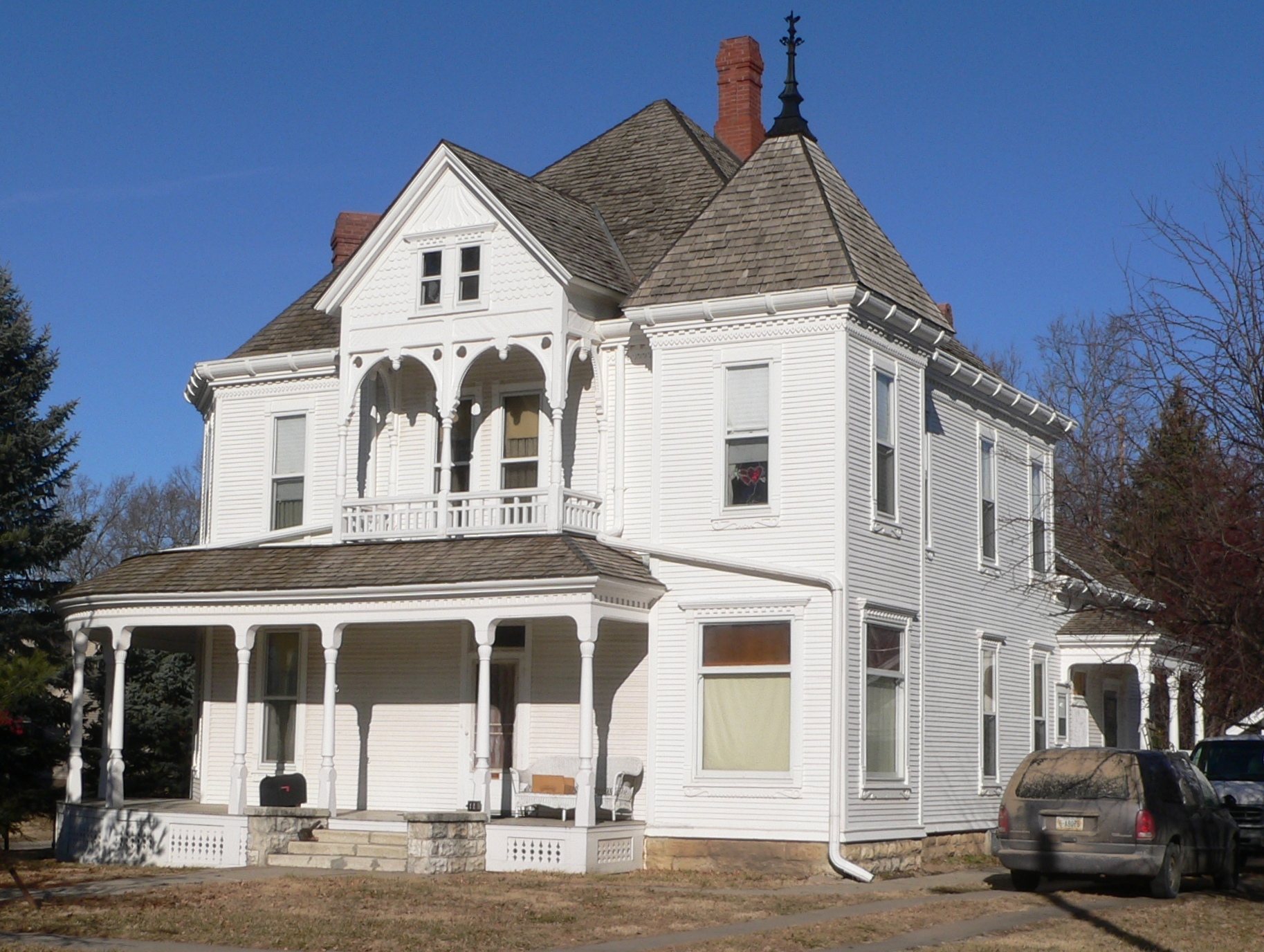

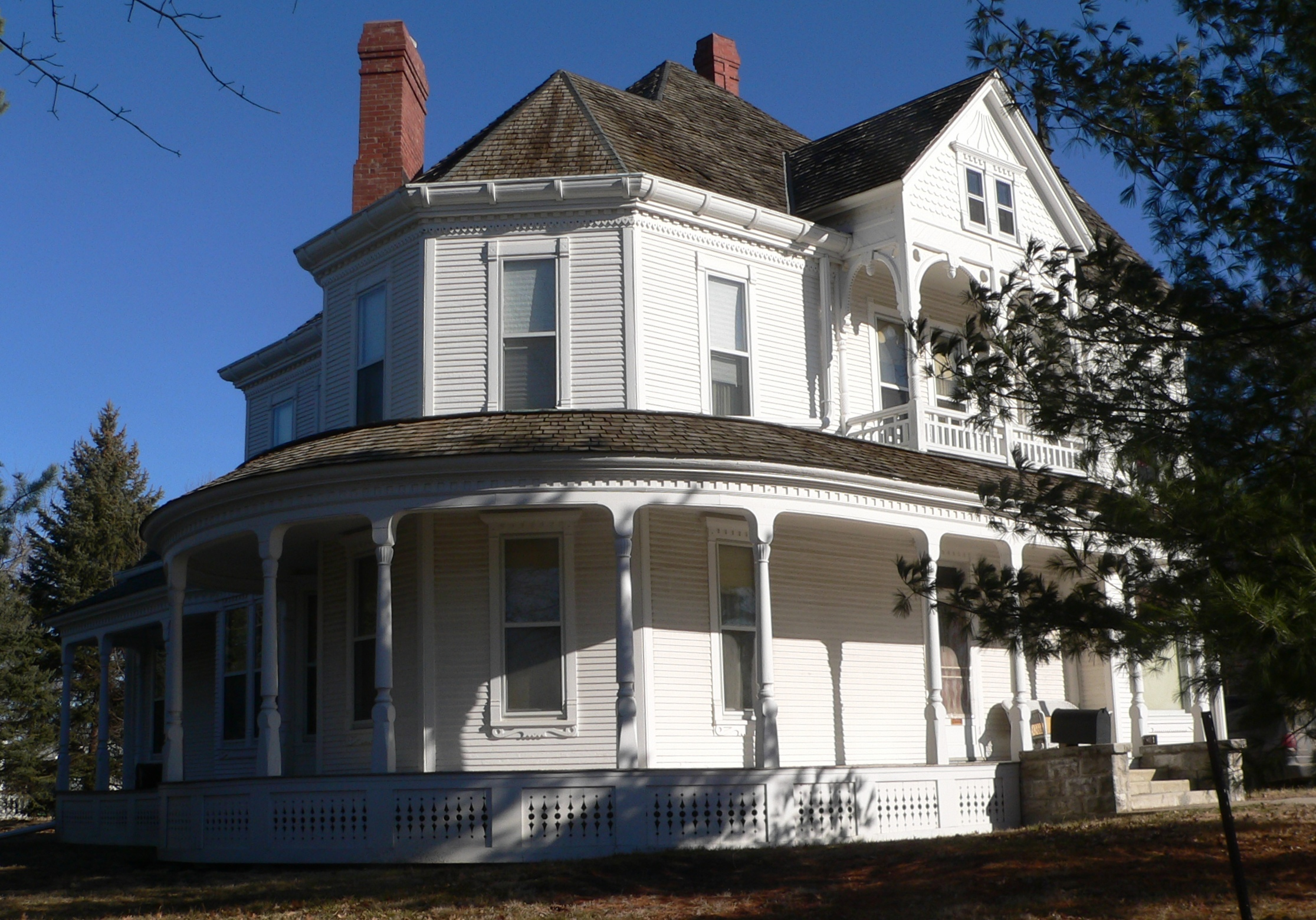

== See also ==
- Bethany, Nebraska
- Cotner College
- Neighborhoods in Lincoln, Nebraska
- History of Lincoln, Nebraska
- National Register of Historic Places listings in Nebraska
