= College View Public Library =

Historic building in Lincoln, Nebraska, United States

- U.S. National Register of Historic Places
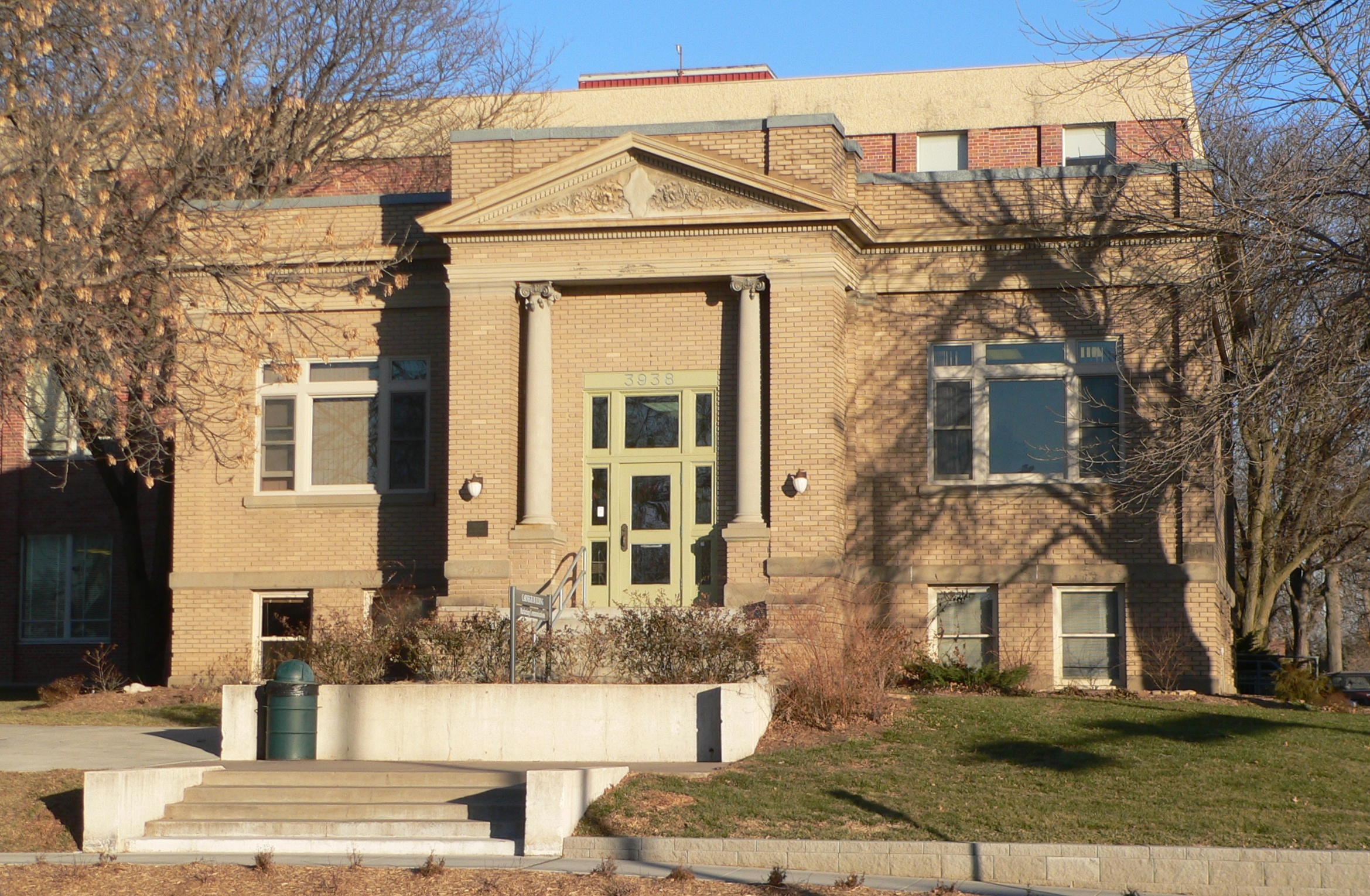
- The library in 2012

- Location within Nebraska Location within the United States
- Location: 3800 South 48th Street, Lincoln, Nebraska
- Coordinates: 40°46′24″N 96°39′13″W
- Area: less than one acre
- Built: 1916
- Architect: J. G. L. Cordner
- Architectural style: Classical Revival
- NRHP reference No.: 84002486
- Added to NRHP: June 28, 1984

The College View Public Library is a historic building in the College View neighborhood of Lincoln, Nebraska, United States. It was built in 1916 as a Carnegie library with a $7,500 grant from the Carnegie Corporation. The design is Classical Revival, with "a symmetrical front facade, simple brick corner pilasters, a water table and wall cornice, and a pedimented entrance enframed by Roman Ionic columns in antis". It has been listed on the National Register of Historic Places since June 28, 1984.

The building functioned as a library from 1916 to 1971. It was the fourth public library for College View, the first two having burned down, and was built on land supplied by adjacent Union College. College View was annexed by Lincoln in 1930; the city assumed control of the College View library and made it a branch of the Lincoln public library system. However, it was increasingly outdated and unsuited for the residential growth experienced by the area in the 1950s and 1960s.

In 1971, the College View branch was replaced by the Charles H. Gere Branch Library as part of a modernization program funded by voters two years prior. Ownership of the building reverted to adjacent Union College, which relocated campus radio station KUCV into the building. KUCV continued to operate from the library until it was sold to the Nebraska Educational Telecommunications Commission in 1988. The building currently houses offices for Union College.

== History ==
=== Earlier College View libraries ===
The community of College View first established a library in June 1900, when a petition circulated by local school principal M. E. Kern led to the village council establishing a subscription and a property tax. The small collection of books was originally housed in part of a new two-story building on the northeast corner of 48th and Prescott streets owned by dentist Zaimon Nicola; the library opened on March 22, 1901, only to burn down the same day.

Nicola rebuilt the structure, while Kern acquired books from Chicago to restock. The new, steel-clad building was destroyed by fire in October 1903; a new library was built using the remaining six books and insurance proceeds.

=== Carnegie library ===
With 658 books, in 1908, a request was sent to Andrew Carnegie for funds to build a more suitable permanent library structure. A $7,500 grant was received. In 1912, Union College provided land on the northeast corner of 48th and Prescott for a new library on condition that the land would revert to the college if the library ever closed. Excavation began in 1915, and the new library was opened in January 1916. By June 30, 1916, the library had a collection of 2,584 volumes. In part based on book donation events, the collection had more than doubled to some 6,000 volumes by 1928, with the library receiving some 17,000 visitors in a year.

College View was annexed into the city of Lincoln in January 1930, and the city library board absorbed the College View library as a branch of the Lincoln public library system. By 1953, it was the only Lincoln public library to maintain Sunday hours; the Lincoln Sunday Journal and Star noted that it "had patrons from many parts of Lincoln, even sections quite a distance from the library".

=== Replacement ===
In 1963, Union College began desiring the land on which the College View library sat for expansion of the science building. The Carnegie library had become inadequate for the growing population and needs of the surrounding areas, and its replacement had come to be viewed as eventually necessary. In 1965, Union College presented a 10-year building program that included the demolition of the library for a second addition to the nearby science building.

Meanwhile, in 1964, the city of Lincoln began reviewing possible proposals for the consolidation and replacement of small Carnegie libraries elsewhere in the city, on the northeast side. A 1967 consultant report suggested creating three new libraries to replace most of the existing branches in the Lincoln system and noted that the general consensus found the College View branch outmoded, with poor parking and the continued desire for Union College to use the parcel for expansion.

In 1969, Lincoln voters passed a bond issue providing money for the building of new library branches. The Charles H. Gere Branch Library opened in October 1971 and replaced College View. Fixtures from the closed libraries were sold to the public; the director of Lincoln's library system told The Lincoln Star that everything bar the Venetian blinds was sold from the College View branch.

=== Use after 1971 ===
Union College intended to house a museum in the building until its eventual demolition. However, by late 1975, work had begun to convert the building to broadcasting use for KUCV, the radio station owned by the college. During its decade-plus in the College View Public Library, the station grew from a 10-watt outlet to a major regional public radio station. KUCV also briefly published Lincoln magazine, whose offices were located in the basement. KUCV was acquired by the Nebraska Educational Telecommunications Commission in June 1988 and moved into its facilities on 33rd Street in September.

The building, under the name Carnegie Building, presently serves as offices for Union Adventist University, housing its Integrated Marketing and Communications Department. The institution changed its name in 2024.

== Architecture ==
The College View Public Library is a rectangular, one-story building with a raised basement. Its size reflects standards issued by the Carnegie Corporation in 1911, while its limited grant funding may account for architect J. G. L. Cordner's restrained execution of the Neoclassical Revival architectural style. However, the classical style largely conforms to that used by other public buildings in Nebraska of the period and other Carnegie libraries. Few modifications had been made to the exterior by 1984, when the structure was nominated for the National Register, primarily the installation of more energy-efficient windows; the interior had been altered to provide studios and offices for KUCV.
