= Walter Carter =

Walter Carter may refer to:

- Walter C. Carter (1929–2002), Canadian politician
- Walter P. Carter (1923–1971), civil rights activist in Baltimore
- Ted Carter (Walter Edward Carter Jr., born 1959), American academic administrator and United States Navy admiral
