= Lewis Worthington Smith =

American academic and poet (1866–1947)

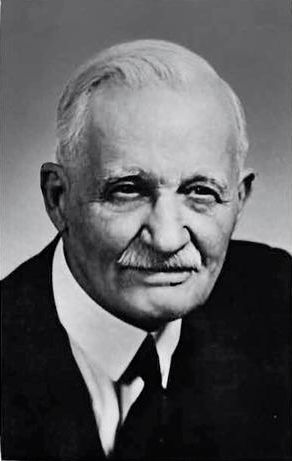
- Smith in 1923
- Born: November 22, 1866; Malta, Illinois, U.S.
- Died: December 1947; Des Moines, Iowa, U.S.
- Occupation(s): Professor and writer

Lewis Worthington Smith (November 22, 1866 – December 1947) was an American professor and writer. Smith led the Drake University Department of English for 34 years. His works include poems and books about writing. His work was well-received and often republished.

== Personal life and death ==
Smith was born on November 22, 1866, in Malta, Illinois, to Dwight A. Smith and Sarah Elizabeth (Lewis) Smith. By 1885, the Smiths were resident within Lone Tree Precinct, Clay County, Nebraska.

He attended Beloit College in Wisconsin, and he later attended Cotner University in Nebraska from which he received a Bachelor of Philosophy degree in 1889. For Smith's undergraduate course, he was an educator at Fairfield College. Smith married Jessica Belle Welborne on August 24, 1897. Cotner University gave Smith a Master of Arts degree in 1901.

Smith died in Des Moines, Iowa, in December 1947.

== Career ==
After graduating, Smith taught in Nebraska high schools and colleges. He was an associate professor of English at Cotner University, an English professor at Tabor College in Iowa, and an English professor at Drake University in Iowa. Smith led the Drake University Department of English for 34 years. His wife influenced him to organize an Iowa Authors Homecoming in 1914, along with Iowa Day in 1916. Smith was more known for his literature than for his professorship. His work was published in well-known magazines. In 1906, Smith published In the Furrow and it was his first book of poetry. His next publication was the comedy-drama play titled "The Art of Life", and the play was performed in 1909 and 1910. Smith's book of war poetry titled The English Tongue was published in 1916 by the Four Seas Company. His other works include The Writing of the Short Story and Modern Composition and Rhetoric. Smith's work was well-received and was often republished, but he lost much of his audience in the 1920s due to changing tastes and styles. He retired from Drake University in 1940. Smith received royalties from his textbook The Mechanism of English Style for 20 years.

== Reception ==
The Inlander praised Smith's 1902 work The Writing of the Short Story for "applying formula and symbolic representation to such abstract things as visualization", although the reviewer criticized the book for not treating a short story as any different from a novel's structure. Educational Review stated that the book is great for teachers to use, but that the theory might be too much for non-psychology students. The book was reviewed favorably by The Chautauquan for not only how it helps people build short stories, but also how it included the psychology behind it.

Gerald Stanley Lee said that "In the Furrow may not quite always satisfy the outer ear, but there is about it a kind of stern hardy singing that many of us have looked for in vain as of late." The Bay State Monthly stated that In the Furrow is a "dainty little volume" which has poems that "are varied in theme, and each one is really poetical thought, well expressed."
