= William Stanley Braithwaite =

American poet and anthologist (1878–1962)

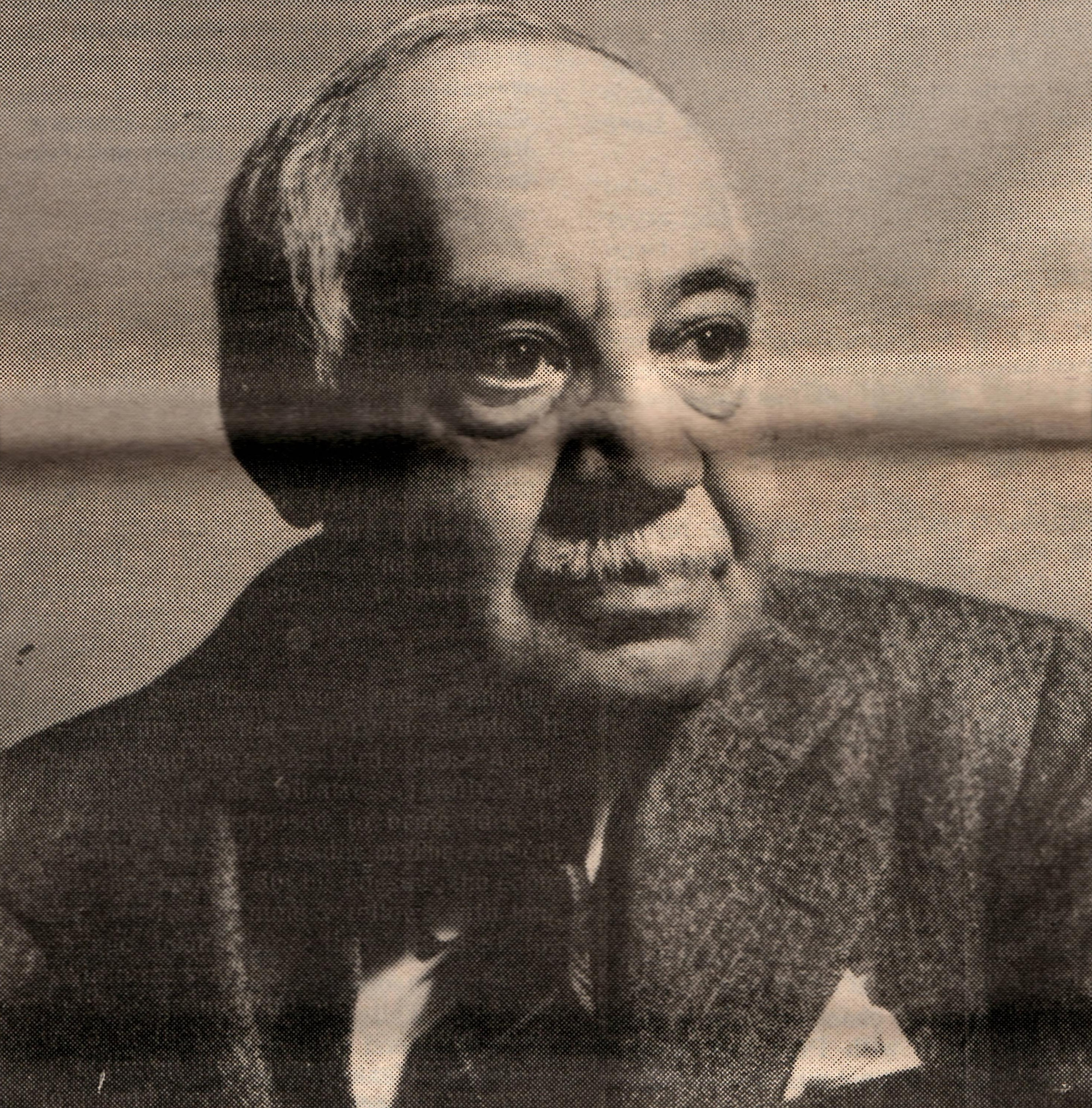
- Born: William Stanley Beaumont Braithwaite; December 6, 1878; Boston, Massachusetts, U.S.
- Died: June 8, 1962 (aged 83); New York City, New York, U.S.
- Spouse: Emma Kelly (m. 1903)
- Children: Fiona Rossetti Braithwaite (Carter), Katherine Keats Braithwaite (Arnold), Cayman Braithwaite (Agard). William Stanley Beaumont Braithwaite, Jr., Paul Ledoux Braithwaite, Arnold D. Braithwaite.

William Stanley Beaumont Braithwaite (December 6, 1878 – June 8, 1962) was an Black American writer, poet, literary critic, anthologist, and publisher in the United States. His work as a critic and anthologist was widely praised and important in the development of East Coast poetry styles in the early 20th century. He was awarded the Spingarn Medal in 1918.

== Personal life ==
Braithwaite was born in Boston, Massachusetts, in 1878. According to historian and journalist Jill Lepore, his father "came from a wealthy British Guiana family; his mother was the daughter of a North Carolina slave." His father preferred that the children be educated at home, and until his untimely death, they were raised in a genteel household of means. Braithwaite married Emma Kelly in 1903; they had seven children.

Braithwaite died at his home at 409 Edgecombe Avenue in Harlem, New York, aged 83, after a brief illness on June 8, 1962.

== Career ==
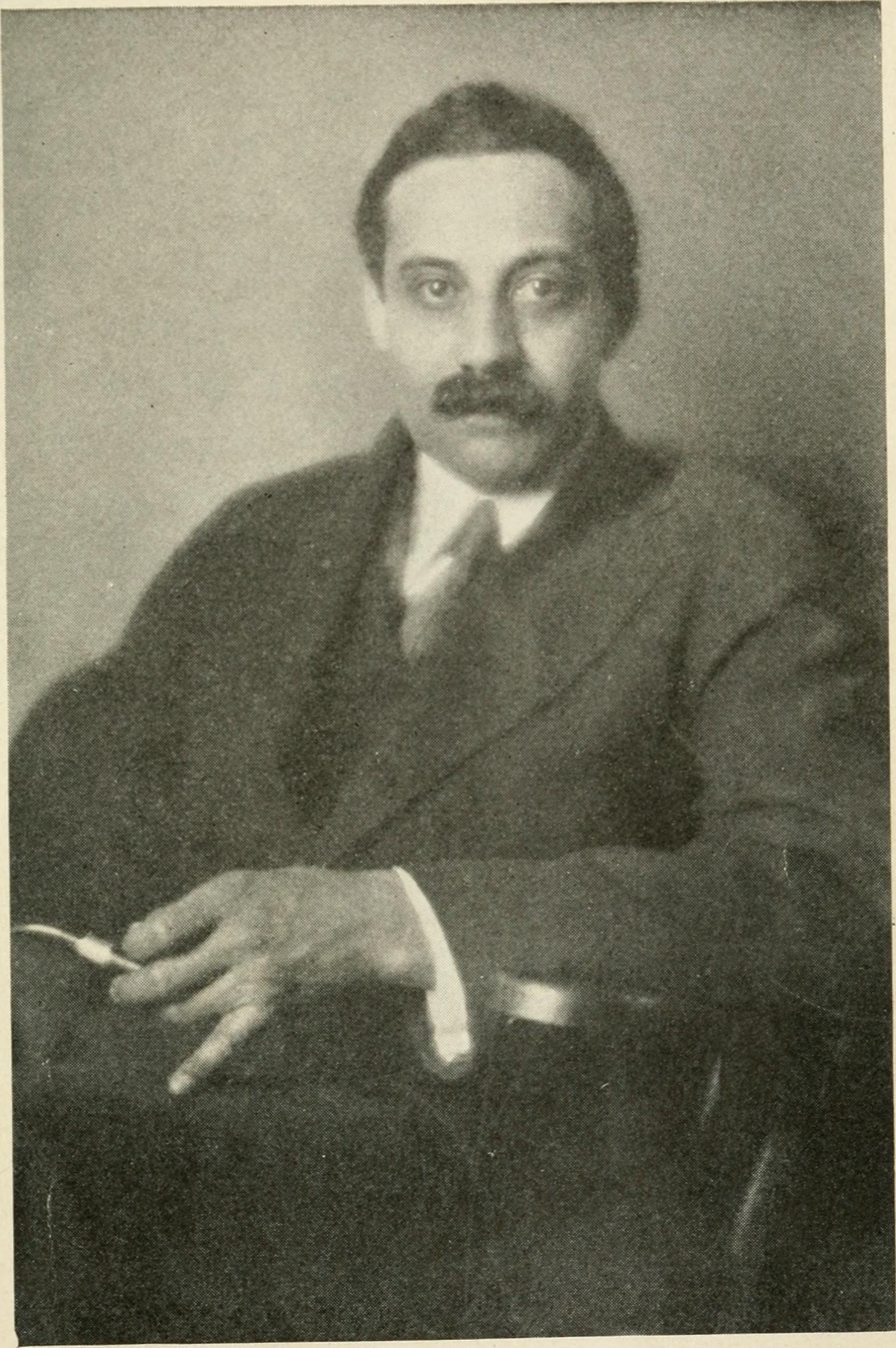
Braithwaite c. 1918

At the age of 12, upon the death of his father, Braithwaite was forced to quit school to support his family. When he was aged 15 he was apprenticed to a typesetter for the Boston publisher, Ginn & Co., where he discovered an affinity for lyric poetry and began to write his own poems.The first text he printed was Life of Lord Nelson.

After early publications in periodicals, he published his first collection of 63 poems, Lyrics of Life and Love, at the age of 26 in 1904. From 1901 to 1902, Braithwaite served as an editor of the Boston-published The Colored American Magazine. By 1906, he had been accepted as a member of the prestigious Boston Authors Club.

From 1905 to 1931, he wrote for the Boston Evening Transcript, contributing columns about contemporary poets and an annual survey of the field. He also wrote articles, reviews and poetry for many other periodicals and journals, including the Atlantic Monthly, The Nation, The New York Times, The New Republic, The Crisis, Opportunity, and The Colored American Magazine. He also began publishing anthologies on poetry of various periods, such as the Georgian and Elizabethan eras.

=== Annual anthologies ===
The surveys that Braithwaite published in the Boston Evening Transcript led him to begin his most important life work: publishing an annual anthology of "Magazine Verse". These anthologies covered a wide range of poets, from the conservative to the avant-garde, the established to the new, as well as an introduction in which Braithwaite discussed his perspective on the current state of poetry. The works published were culled from both commercial magazines and modernist little magazines. They also included indexes of published verse and other information that provided insight into publishing trends of the day. Braithwaite indicated favored works in these lists with an asterisk, establishing in this way his own "canon" of poets and poems. Though Braithwaite has been received with ambivalence by Black critics from his own lifetime to today for his lack of discussion of Black American issues in both his verse and anthologies, his anthologies are notable for their inclusion of Black American writers. The success and influence of Braithwaite's anthology series may be seen in its growing length: the first was 87 pages in length, while the 15th reached more than 1,000. Though influential, however, the anthologies were not moneymakers; they were published by five different houses over the years, and unlike some anthologies of the time, did not receive payment for including a poet's work.

=== Magazine publishing ===
Braithwaite launched a periodical, Poetry Journal, in December 1912, but not long afterwards, handed off the project to others. He launched another periodical, the monthly Poetry Review of America, in 1916; this project folded after less than a year.

=== Book publishing ===
In 1921, he established the B. J. Brimmer publishing company, which published poetry, non-fiction, and anthologies. Braithwaite's business partner and treasurer of the company was the writer and poet Winifred Virginia Jackson, known for her collaborations with H. P. Lovecraft. A surviving letter from Lovecraft to Braithwaite, dated 1930, mentions Jackson and references previous correspondence between the two men.

=== Professorship and retirement ===
In 1935, Braithwaite assumed a professorship of creative literature at the historically Black Atlanta University. He retired from this position in 1945. In 1946, he and his family moved to Sugar Hill in Harlem, New York, where Braithwaite continued to write and publish poetry, essays and anthologies. He was often alienated from his colleagues at the university due to his lack of any formal education or degrees and what was seen as his "standoffish" nature.

=== Harlem Renaissance ===
Braithwaite is recognized as having a significant role in publishing Harlem Renaissance poets for a wide audience through his anthologies, despite his own conservatism in discussing race in his own work. In 1927, the poet Countee Cullen dedicated the anthology Caroling Dusk, An Anthology of Negro Poets, to Braithwaite. James Weldon Johnson acknowledged Braithwaite as an influence upon his work.

== Works ==
=== Fiction ===
- The Canadian (1901)
- The Story of the Great War (juvenile; essays), F. A. Stokes, 1919
- Going Over Tindal: A Fragment Wrenched From the Life of Titus Jabson (novel), B. J. Brimmer, 1924
- Frost on the Green Leaf (short stories)

=== Poetry ===
- Lyrics of Life and Love (Boston: H. B. Turner, 1904)
- The House of Falling Leaves (Boston: J. W. Luce, 1908)
- Selected Poems (New York: Coward-McCann, 1948)

=== Non-fiction ===
- Preface, V. Stanley Milliken, Songs of the Nomad: Some Posthumous Poems (Providence: Printed by F. H. Townsend, 1907)
- Introduction, Charles Gibson, The Wounded Eros: Sonnets (Cambridge: Riverside Press, 1908)
- Preface, The Poetry of Thomas S. Jones, Jr (Clinton, NY: George William Browning, 1910)
- Introduction to Edward Smyth Jones, The Sylvan Cabin: A Centenary Ode on the Birth of Lincoln and Other Verses (Boston: Sherman French, 1911)
- The Poetic Year for 1916: A Critical Anthology (Boston: Small, Maynard, 1917)
- Introduction to Georgia Douglas Johnson, The Heart of a Woman: And Other Poems (Boston: Cornhill, 1918)
- Introduction to A. E. Housman, A Shropshire Lad (Boston: Four Seas, 1919)
- The Story of the Great War (New York: Frederick Stokes, 1919)
- Introduction to B. 8266, Penitentiary, A Tale of a Walled Town: and Other Verses (Philadelphia: Lippincott, 1921)
- Introduction to Brookes More, The Beggar's Vision (Boston: Cornhill, 1921)
- Introduction to J. Corson Miller, Veils of Samite (Boston: Small, Maynard, 1921)
- Foreword to Maud Cuney Hare, The Message of the Trees (Boston: Cornhill, 1921)
- John Myers O'Hara and the Grecian Influence (Portland, ME: Smith and Sale, 1926)
- Introduction to Rosa Zagnioni Marinoni and Mary Carolyn Davies, Red Kites and Wooden Crosses (Chicago: Packard, 1929)
- Introduction to Mae Cowdery, We Lift Our Voices and Other Poems (Philadelphia: Alpress, 1936)
- Biographical essay in S. S. Van Dine, Philo Vance Murder Cases (New York/London: Scribner's, 1936)
- The Bewitched Parsonage: The Story of the Brontës, Coward-McCann, 1950.
- The William Stanley Braithwaite Reader, edited by Philip Butcher (Ann Arbor: University of Michigan Press, 1972)
- The House Under Artcthurus. Unfinished autobiography published in part in the periodical Phylon (1941-1942).

=== Anthology editor ===
- Book of Elizabethan Verse, with an introduction by Thomas Wentworth Higginson (Boston: Herbert B. Turner, 1906)
- Book of Georgian Verse ( London: Grant Richards, 1909)
- Book of Restoration Verse (New York: Brentanos and London: Duckworth, 1910)
- Anthology of Magazine Verse for 1913: Including the Magazines and the Poets: A Review (Cambridge, MA: W.S. B., 1913)
- Anthology of Magazine Verse for 1914: And Year Book of American Poetry (Cambridge, MA: W.S. B., 1914) Anthology of Magazine Verse for 1914 via HathiTrust
- Anthology of Magazine Verse for 1915: and Year Book of American Poetry (New York: Gomme and Marshall, 1915)
- Anthology of Magazine Verse for 1916 and Year Book of American Poetry
- With Henry Thomas Schnittkind, Representative American Poetry (Boston: R. G. Badger, 1916)
- Anthology of Magazine Verse for 1917 and Yearbook of American Poetry (Boston: Small, Maynard, 1917)
- Anthology of Magazine Verse for 1918 and Year Book of American Poetry (Boston: Small, Maynard, 1918)
- The Golden Treasury of Magazine Verse (Boston: Small, Maynard and London: G. Harrap, 1918)
- Anthology of Magazine Verse for 1919: And Year Book of American Poetry (Boston: Small, Maynard, 1919) Anthology of Magazine Verse for 1919 via HathiTrust
- The Book of Modern British Verse, (Boston: Small, Maynard, 1919)
- Victory! Celebrated by Thirty-Eight American Poets, introduction by Theodore Roosevelt (Boston: Small, Maynard, 1919)
- Anthology of Magazine Verse for 1920: And Year Book of American Poetry (Boston: Small, Maynard, 1920)
- Anthology of Magazine Verse for 1921: And Year Book of American Poetry (Cambridge, Mass: W.S. Braithwaite, 1921)
- Anthology of Magazine Verse for 1922: And Year Book of American Poetry
- Anthology of Magazine Verse for 1923: And Year Book of American Poetry (Boston: B. J. Brimmer, 1923)
- Anthology of Magazine Verse for 1924: And Year Book of American Poetry
- Anthology of Magazine Verse for 1925: And Year Book of American Poetry
- Anthology of Magazine Verse for 1926: And Year Book of American Poetry
- Anthology of Magazine Verse for 1927: And Year Book of American Poetry (Cambridge, MA: W.S. Braithwaite, 1927)
- Anthology of Magazine Verse for 1928: And Yearbook of American Poetry (New York: Harold Vinal, 1928)
- Anthology of Magazine Verse for 1929: And Yearbook of American Poetry
- Our Lady's Choir: A Contemporary Anthology of Verse by Catholic Sisters, foreword by Hugh Francis Blunt, introduction by Ralph Adams Cram (Boston: Bruce Humphries, 1931)
- Anthology of American Verse for 1958 with Margaret Haley Carpenter (New York: Schulte Publishing Company, 1958)

=== Magazine editor ===
- Poetry Journal, published at the Four Seas Company (1912–1914)
- The Citizen (Boston, 1915)
- Stratford Monthly: A Forum of Contemporary International Thought (1916)
- Poetry Review of America (1916–1917)

=== Selected anthology appearances ===
- In Alain Locke, The New Negro (1925)
- In James Weldon Johnson, The Book of American Negro Poetry (New York: Harcourt Brace, 1931)
- In Menckeniana: A Schimpflexicon (New York: Knopf, 1929)
- In Langston Hughes and Arno Bontemps, The Poetry of the Negro, 1746-1949 (Garden City: Doubleday, 1949)

== Awards ==
In 1918, Braithwaite was awarded the Spingarn Medal by the National Association for the Advancement of Colored People (NAACP).

== Archives ==
The Albert and Shirley Small Special Collections Library at the University of Virginia holds 40 boxes of manuscripts, correspondence, and other related materials related mainly to this editorial work, in three separate Braithwaite collections.

Harvard University's Houghton Library holds a 30-box collection comprising mostly letters from poets to Braithwaite.
