= Vinita Sauder =

29th President of Union College
- Incumbent
- Assumed office 2014

Personal details
- Education: Southern Adventist University; University of Tennessee at Chattanooga; Andrews University

Vinita Sauder is an American academic administrator serving as the 29th president of Union College from 2014 to 2024.

== Life ==
Sauder earned a B.A. in journalism and communication from Southern Adventist University in 1978. She received a M.B.A. from the University of Tennessee at Chattanooga in 1989. Sauder earned a Ph.D. in educational leadership from Andrews University. Her 2008 dissertation was titled, Marketing Seventh-day Adventist Higher Education: College-Choice Motivators and Barriers. Loretta B. Johns was her doctoral advisor.

In 1990, Sauder joined Southern Adventist University as an assistant professor of business and management. She was promoted to associate vice president for academic administration and director of institutional research and effectiveness in 1996. In 1998, she became the vice president for marketing and enrollment services. Sauder became the 29th president of Union College in 2014. She is its first female president. Sauder announced she was stepping down in 2024 and will be succeeded by Yamileth Bazan.
