= KUCV =

Coordinates: 40.518°N 96.769°W

- Lincoln, Nebraska; United States
- Frequency: 91.1 MHz (HD Radio)
- Branding: Nebraska Public Media

Programming
- Format: Public radio; News, classical music
- Subchannels: HD2: News, jazz
- Affiliations: NPR; APM; PRX

Ownership
- Owner: Nebraska Educational Telecommunications Commission

History
- First air date: October 22, 1967 (at 91.3)
- Former frequencies: 91.3 MHz (1967–1980); 90.9 MHz (1980–2001)
- Call sign meaning: "Union College Voice"

Technical information
- Licensing authority: FCC
- Facility ID: 47966
- Class: C1
- ERP: 100,000 watts
- HAAT: 210 meters (690 ft)

Links
- Public license information: Public file; LMS
- Webcast: Stream
- Website: nebraskapublicmedia.org

KUCV (91.1 FM) is a radio station in Lincoln, Nebraska, United States. A member of NPR, it is owned by the Nebraska Educational Telecommunications Commission (NETC) and is the flagship station of the Nebraska Public Media radio network.

KUCV signed on for the first time in 1967, originally owned by Union College, a liberal arts institution affiliated with the Seventh-day Adventist Church. After a substantial power increase in 1980, it joined NPR in 1983 as the network's second member in Nebraska. The NETC bought the station in 1988, making it the first station in its statewide public radio network.

== History ==
=== Early years ===
The history of radio broadcasting at Union College dates to 1960, when a five-watt, carrier current station began broadcasting for several hours a day. It was programmed by students and overseen by the speech department. In March 1967, the college applied to the Federal Communications Commission (FCC) to replace KVUC with an FM station at 91.3 MHz. The FCC granted the permit for the 10-watt outlet in May, and KUCV began broadcasting on October 22, 1967, airing 35 hours of programming a week.

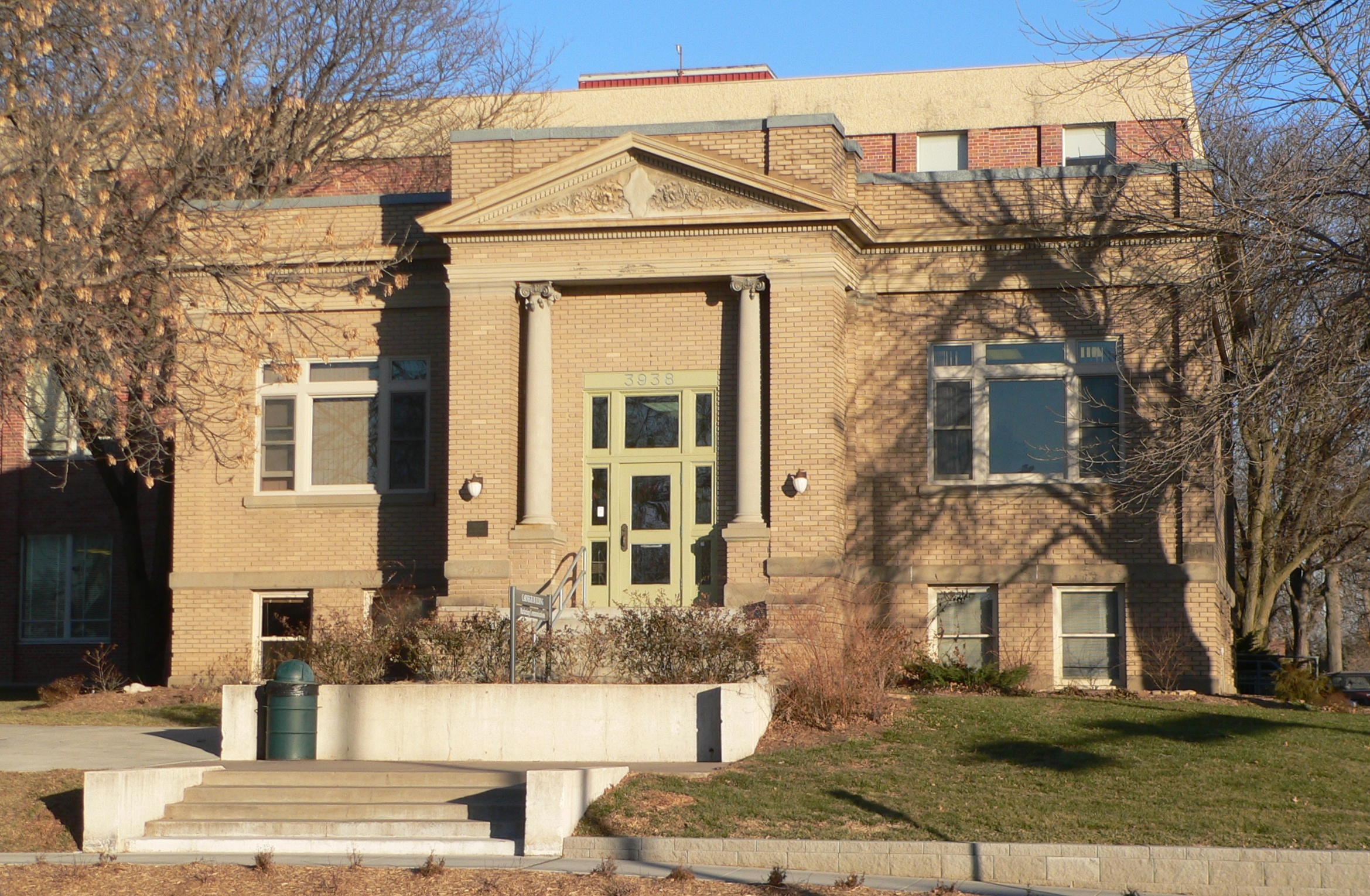
The former College View Public Library on the Union College campus housed KUCV's studios from 1976 through 1988.

Originally primarily airing taped educational programming, much of it from other colleges, KUCV began airing evening classical music programming in 1975 and planned a power increase and the beginning of stereo broadcasting; in 1977, an Adventist radio station in Tennessee donated a 200-foot (61 m) tower to the college to increase the station's coverage area. As part of the upgrades, KUCV moved to the former College View Public Library near the campus at 49th and Prescott streets, which was listed on the National Register of Historic Places in 1984. That year, Eric Graham arrived as KUCV's first full-time station manager began work, and the station began airing classical music full time. The new tower was installed in February 1978; KUCV also tweaked its format to provide more comprehensive fine arts programming.

=== Growing into a regional station ===
A substantial power increase had been part of Union College's long-term vision for KUCV. Union College applied to boost KUCV's effective radiated power to 20,000 watts in May 1978, concurrent with a proposed move to 90.9 mHz. According to KUCV's first full-time station manager, Eric Graham, the proposed power increase would expand KUCV's footprint to 50 miles and allow it to become the source for "fine arts radio" and "non-commercial alternative" programming in the capital. Union College initiated a fundraising campaign to support station upgrades. The station also added a morning program in addition to its late afternoon and nightly weekday schedule, and made plans to expand its programming to 18 hours per day. After delays caused by an opposition from Omaha television station WOWT, which operated in the nearby channel 6 (82–88 MHz) and objected to possible interference, the FCC approved the power increase and frequency change in June 1979; KUCV moved to 90.9 MHz on February 5, 1980. After the change, the station had to provide band-pass filters for Lincoln television viewers who complained of interference to reception of WOWT.

KUCV's power expansion came at a time when the establishment of a statewide public radio network was under debate and opposed by commercial broadcasters. A representative of the Corporation for Public Broadcasting (CPB) hailed the increase as the first step toward public radio in Nebraska. At the time, there was only one NPR member station in the state, KIOS-FM in Omaha. However, the CPB denied KUCV's first application for a grant, only awarding 14 grants of the 75 applications it had received that year. During this time, KUCV began offering Radio Talking Book, the regional radio reading service based in Omaha, on its FM subcarrier. Two years later, the CPB approved the station's application for a community service grant. In the wake of that award, KUCV joined NPR in September 1982 and began broadcasting its programming at the end of January 1983.

With the public radio plan of 1980 requiring state appropriation, a new plan was formulated in 1982 that contemplated using KUCV as the nucleus for expanding public radio throughout the state. The plan called for building new stations in the Tri-Cities, North Platte, Norfolk, and Scottsbluff; a possible station in Omaha; and an AM radio station in Lincoln to complement KUCV's classical programming with an all-talk and information format. The Lincoln AM station would have been on 1180 kHz, which was also sought by four other applicants including country musician Charley Pride. However, commercial broadcasters balked at making KUCV the key station in the proposed network because it continued to offer some Adventist religious programs, filing an objection with the FCC. Jack McBride, the head of Nebraska Educational Television (NETV), proposed a radio service utilizing the resources of the University of Nebraska system.

=== Transfer to state ownership ===
In 1984, KUCV made a new public radio proposal under which a private, non-profit group would run the network to utilize KUCV as well as the NETV transmitter sites, which had been built with provision for FM facilities, and ideally one of the existing Omaha-area public stations. However, later that year, the station's community advisory board opted to shift focus toward the long-range development of KUCV itself. Facing a need to attract more funding, the board commissioned a study in March 1986 on possibly separating KUCV from Union College, which was facing declining enrollment and a reduction of students in Seventh-day Adventist high school academies. That April, governor Bob Kerrey signed a bill authorizing the Nebraska Educational Telecommunications Commission (NETC), parent of NETV, to own public radio stations in areas previously without them, though no funding was provided; in August, McBride proposed the idea of the University of Nebraska–Lincoln taking on KUCV to use as the base for its radio service.

The Union College board approved the concept of transferring the KUCV license to a community group in August 1986. That fall, the college began discontinuing its financial subsidy of the station to redirect the money to academic programs; the community board was asked whether the station should be spun out to a community licensee or sold to the NETC. In May 1987, the board voted to endorse a sale to the state, citing the greater potential for long-term stability under state ownership; it stipulated that the station remain a predominantly classical music station.

On June 8, 1988, the license was formally transferred to the Nebraska Educational Telecommunications Commission. On September 30, the station moved out of the College View Public Library and to the NETC building on 33rd Street. Several minor program changes resulted, most notably the removal of Saturday morning religious programming and a church service from the schedule. In June 1989, the station's transmitter facility moved off the Union College campus and onto the tower of commercial station KTGL southeast of Hallam.

=== Statewide expansion ===
The Public Radio Nebraska Foundation was formed after the license transfer to begin raising money in support of KUCV and the statewide expansion of public radio in Nebraska. The first new transmitter, KTNE (91.1 FM) at Alliance, began broadcasting on May 3, 1990; the next day, KLNE (88.7 FM) was activated from Lexington. Also built in 1990 were transmitters at Norfolk and Hastings, followed by Bassett, Chadron, Merriman, and North Platte in 1991. The Chadron and Merriman transmitters opened on August 29, 1991, completing the network. The newly-minted Nebraska Public Radio Network was formally dedicated on October 8 at a special ceremony held at UNL's Lied Center; it was simulcast on Nebraska ETV. For a time, KUCV continued to air classical music on Sunday afternoons while the rest of the network aired a mix of news and music.

In 2001, a new transmitter and antenna were installed, allowing the station to increase its power to 100,000 watts. In order to carry out the increase, KUCV moved to 91.1 MHz.
