= Yamileth Bazan =

American academic administrator

30th President of Union Adventist University
- 2024-
- Assumed office July 1, 2024
- Preceded by: Vinita Sauder

Personal details
- Children: 1
- Education: Loma Linda University; La Sierra University; Andrews University

Yamileth Bazan is an American academic administrator who is the thirtieth president of Union Adventist University.

== Life ==
Bazan earned an associate degree from Loma Linda University. She received a B.A. (1993) in liberal studies and M.A. (2002) in administration and leadership from La Sierra University. She completed a Ph.D. in leadership from Andrews University. Her 2015 dissertation was titled, Diversity and Student Engagement in a Small Multi-ethnic Liberal Arts University in California. Sylvia Gonzalez was her doctoral advisor.

Bazan was a teacher in Adventist elementary schools. She worked in youth ministry for the Southeastern California Conference of Seventh-day Adventists. She taught graduate courses in educational leadership at La Sierra University. From 2007 to 2021, she was the vice president of student life at La Sierra University. She later served as the associate dean for student affairs for the School of Medicine at Loma Linda University In March 2024, she was announced as the incoming thirtieth president of Union College. She succeeded Vinita Sauder on July 1, 2024.

Bazan is married and has a son.
