= Mike Mennard =

American musician (born 1967)

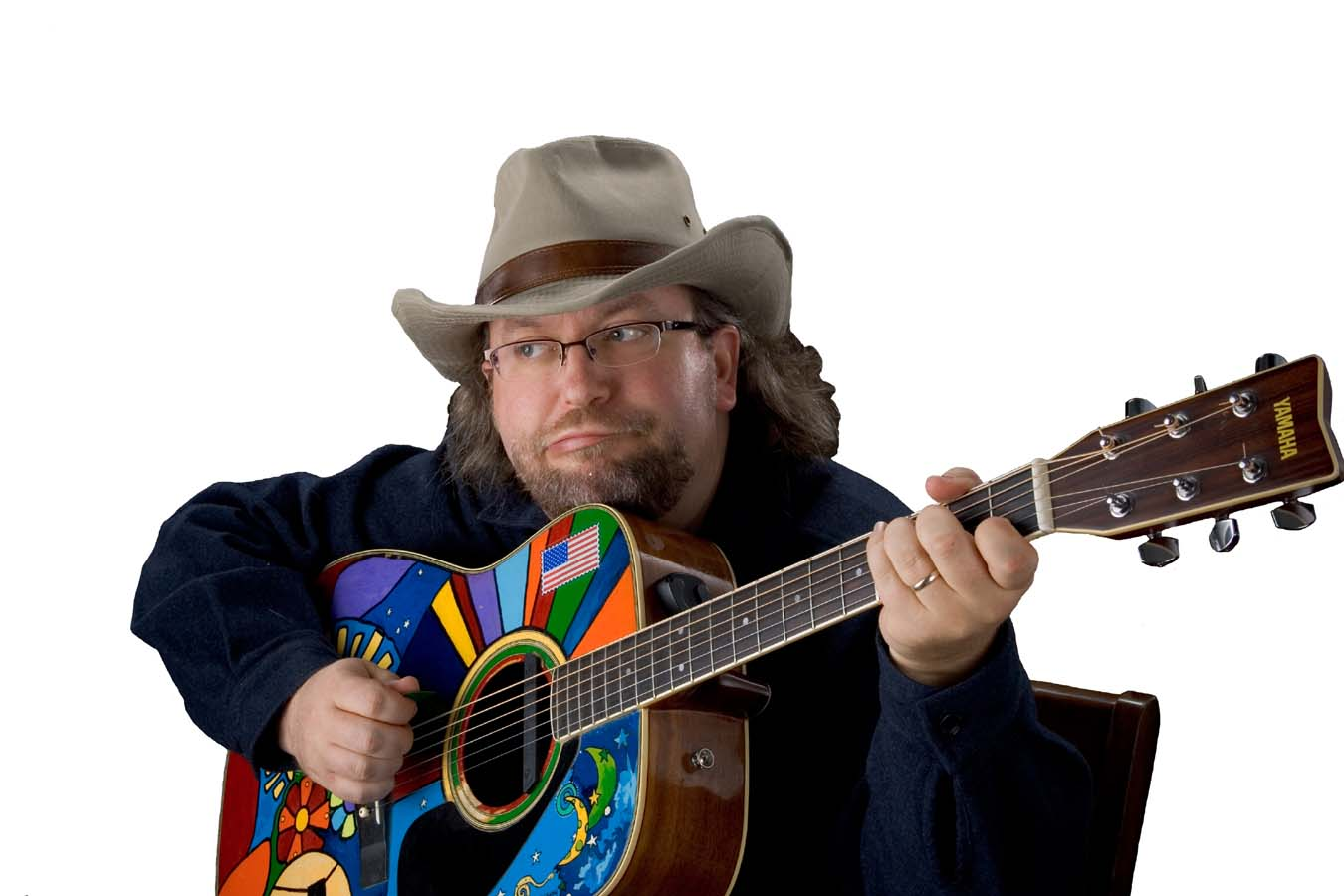
- Mike Mennard

Background information
- Origin: Lincoln, Nebraska, United States
- Genres: Kindie Rock, Children's music
- Years active: Since 2004
- Members: Mike Mennard
- Website: www.mightymagicpants.com/

Mike Mennard (born 1967 in Ft. Worth, Texas) is a children's recording artist based in Lincoln, Nebraska.

== Biography ==
Mennard's biography says:

Mike was painfully shy until is mother coaxed him out of his shell with an ice cream scoop. Handing Mike the utensil as she cooked supper, she told Mike to pretend it was a microphone and entertain her. He did. For hours that night—and for countless nights, thereafter—Mike performed silly songs and poems to his mother. It's safe to say that Mike came out of his shell, and decades later it’s difficult to imagine Mike as anything but a performer. But he claims that that shy little boy still lives inside, which helps him to relate to children—shy ones, as well as not-so-shy ones—better.

Throughout the 1990s, Mennard performed contemporary gospel music extensively throughout the United States. He produced two recordings with Eden Records, "Grace (and Other Stuff)" and "Life With a View." But Mike’s first musical love has been children’s music—or as Mike calls it, “family music.” He incorporated his “family music” in all of his gospel concerts until soon those songs became his most requested. Concert-goers were disappointed when those fun, zany songs were not available on CDs or cassettes. In 2004, Mike solved that dilemma with the release of "Something's Rotting in the Fridge."

Mike has turned his full creative talents toward storytelling and educating through music. He is passionate about writing and performing music and poetry for children (and their families). His shows have become popular attractions, from classrooms and libraries to state fairs and concert halls. As an English professor at Union College in Lincoln, Nebraska, he teaches college students about the values of poetry and music, yet he still believes that one is never too young to learn to appreciate rhythm and rhyme (and wacky humor!). Promoting literacy through music, Mike travels to state reading conferences across the US, entertaining teachers and speaking with them about the importance of keeping rhythm and nonsense alive in the classroom.

In 2004, Mike Mennard recorded his first children's album and has been busy ever since. He has produced six albums and one stage musical (play). His music is family friendly, with humor that adults, children, and educators alike appreciate. Targeting elementary-aged kids, Mike’s sense of humor and interactive performances have won the hearts of critics and families world-wide. No musical style holds Mike prisoner—on any of his albums you’re likely to find rock, rap, bluegrass, hip-hop, opera, lullabies, and everything in between. Perhaps the one thing that distinguishes Mike's work is its interplay between music and poetry. Each album is part music, part poetry, all original; and this may explain why some CDs have as many as 51 tracks.

== Discography ==
- Grace (and Other Stuff) (1991)
- Life With a View (1996)
- Something’s Rotting in the Fridge (2004)
- When Mother Goose Laid an Egg (2007)
- Night at the Whaler’s Inn (2008)
- Pirates do the Darnedest Things (2008)
- We’ve Got it All in Nebraska (2009)
- It's a Pirate's World (2011)
- Gotta be the Pants [with Mighty Magic Pants] (2013)
- Far Out [with Mighty Magic Pants] (2014)
- It Must be Christmas [with Mighty Magic Pants] (2014)

== Stage musicals ==
- That's What Makes Them Pirates (2010)
- Captain Scrooge (2016)

== Books ==
- Can't Keep my Soul from Dancing (2003)
- Shall We Gather at the Potluck (2004)
- The Left-sock Tree (2011)
- Song of the Merrows (2011)
