= Chester Wickwire =

American chaplain and peace activist

- Born: December 11, 1913; Nebraska, USA
- Died: August 31, 2008 (aged 94); Hunt Valley, Maryland, USA
- Education: Union College; Yale Divinity School
- Occupation(s): Chaplain, activist
- Spouse: Mary Ann Wickwire

Chester "Chet" L. Wickwire (December 11, 1913 – August 31, 2008) was the American chaplain emeritus of the Johns Hopkins University. He was a prominent fighter for civil rights and an international peace activist. Reverend Wickwire was remembered as a "consummate humanist" after his death.

== Personal life and education ==
Wickwire was born in Nebraska but was raised in rural Colorado where he received a religious upbringing as a Seventh-day Adventist. He received his B.A. from Union College in Lincoln, Nebraska. During the 1940s he earned the first of two degrees (B.D and Ph.D.) from the Yale Divinity School. While at Yale, he contracted poliomyelitis, which resulted in a thirteen-month stay in a local pauper's hospital; "an experience which he credited as providing him with a broader perspective on the world." Despite his need for crutches afterwards, "Chet the Jet" earned his moniker with his boundless energy. He was ordained in the United Church of Christ. He was married to Mary Ann Wickwire for 71 years until his death. Dr. Wickwire was also an avid poet with two published collections.

His memorial service was attended by numerous community leaders and former U.S. Senator Paul Sarbanes. Sen. Barbara Mikulski wrote a remembrance for the occasion.

== Activities at the Johns Hopkins University ==
In 1953, after graduating from the Yale Divinity School, Dr. Wickwire was hired as the Executive Secretary of the Levering Hall YMCA, located at the Johns Hopkins University. He later became the university chaplain until his retirement in 1984. He became involved in activities both on campus and in Baltimore. In 1958 he started the Tutorial Project, in which Hopkins students volunteered to help tutor Baltimore's underprivileged, largely black urban youth. This community program is still in operation. The university created the Chester Wickwire Diversity Award to honor an "undergraduate student of any race or ethnic background who promotes multicultural harmony on the Homewood Campus."

== Civil rights endeavors ==
Dr. Wickwire organized the first integrated concert to happen in Baltimore. It was held in 1959 at the 5th regiment armory and included Maynard Ferguson and Dave Brubeck. He worked with Baltimore's community leaders, including Walter P. Carter, and ministers in the 1960s to integrate Gwynn Oak Amusement Park. Through his work with community organizations, Dr. Wickwire came to occupy a place of high respect amongst community leaders. Upon the death of its president, Rev. Wickwire was elected the first and only white leader of the Interdenominational Ministerial Alliance, an organization of mostly African-American ministers in Baltimore. In the spring of 1970, when police were searching for members of the Baltimore Black Panthers, they agreed to surrender only to Dr. Wickwire. He was at one time the chairman of the Maryland Advisory Committee to the U.S. Civil Rights Commission.

== Peace and labor activism ==
He was often at odds with the Johns Hopkins University administration as he pursued peace initiatives. He regularly invited speakers such as Philip Berrigan to speak on campus. In 1962, he was detained in Moscow along with Johns Hopkins exchange students for allegedly distributing anti-Soviet literature. He supported a labor boycott of J.P. Stevens & Co. for its anti-union actions in 1977 as co-chairman of a citizens committee. He pushed for better rights and conditions in 1982 for migrant workers in Maryland as chairman of a panel advising the U.S. Commission on Civil Rights. Later, with the same panel, he worked to improve rights of Korean-American storeowners. During the 1990s, Dr. Wickwire made a series of trips to Central America to oppose political oppression as member of Ecumenical Program in Central America (EPICA). For his work, his was given an honorary doctorate from the university of El Salvador.
