= Bethany, Nebraska =

Unincorporated community in Nebraska, United States

- Neighborhood
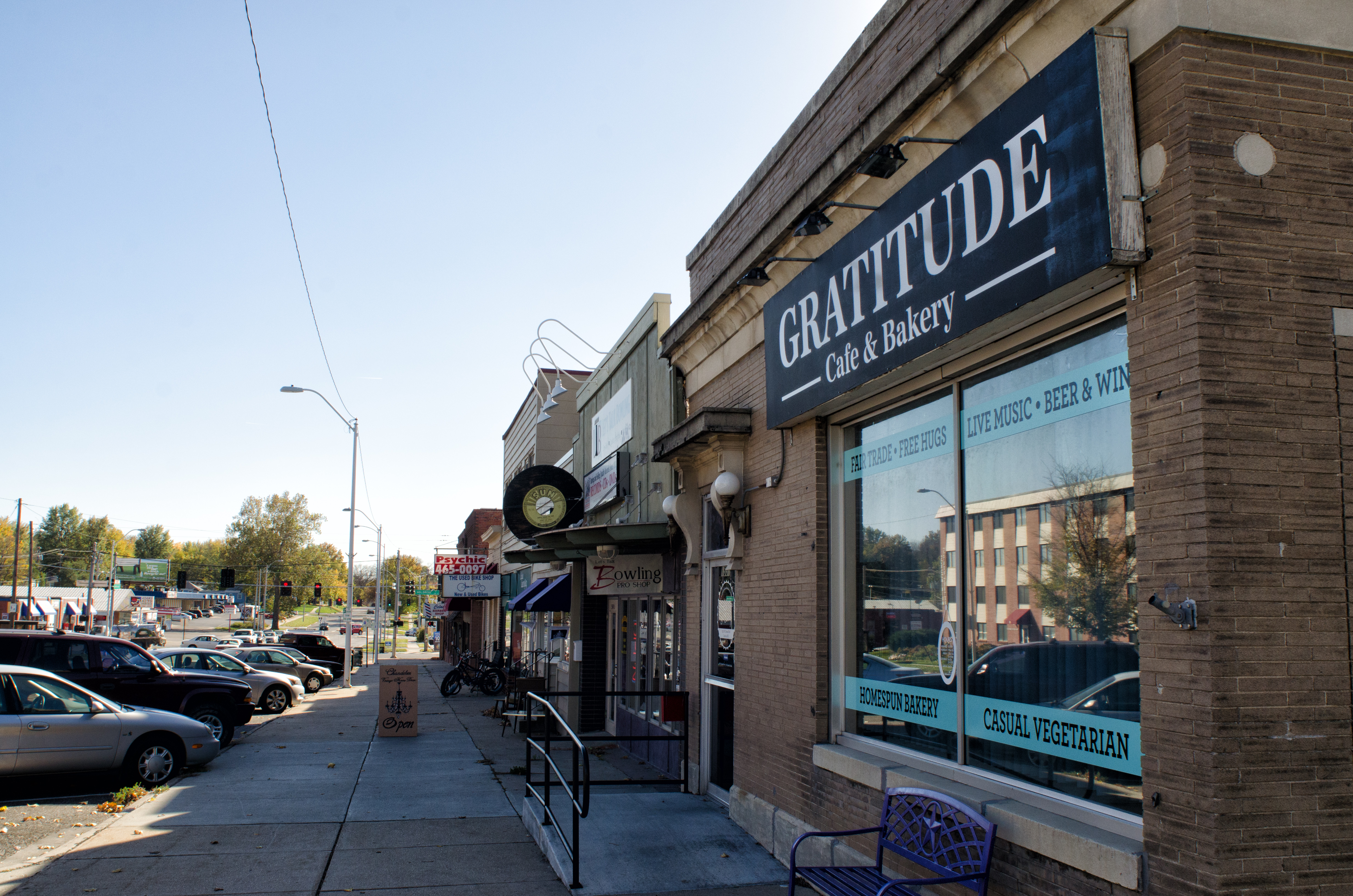
- Cotner Boulevard in the Bethany neighborhood of Lincoln, NE

- Location in Nebraska Location in the United States
- Coordinates: Community 40°49′57″N 96°38′00″W
- Country: United States
- State: Nebraska
- County: Lancaster
- Incorporated: 1890
- Annexed by Lincoln, Nebraska: 1922
- Elevation: 1,224 ft (373 m)
- Time zone: UTC-6 (Central (CST))
  - Summer (DST): UTC-5 (CDT)
- ZIP code: 68505
- Area code: 402
- FIPS code: 31-04720
- GNIS feature ID: 827360

Bethany is a neighborhood and former town in the northeast region of the city of Lincoln, Nebraska, United States.

== History ==
In 1889, Nebraska Christian University was established east of University Place, a town east of Lincoln centered around Nebraska Wesleyan University. The town was incorporated as Bethany Heights in 1890 and the college was renamed Cotner College. The town was named after the biblical village of Bethany, Palestine.

Bethany Heights did not enjoy the same success as Lincoln's other satellite communities. In 1920, Bethany Heights reported a population of 1,078. By comparison, University Place and College View, two other suburbs centered around religious colleges, reported populations of over 4,000 and 2,200 respectively. Havelock, a suburb near Bethany, reported 3,600 residents in 1920. Residents of Bethany Heights relied upon Lincoln for most services, including hospitals, lawyers, doctors, train depots, hotels, dry goods, and even cemeteries. Due to this reliance, the town voted to be annexed as Bethany by the city of Lincoln in 1922. However, the annexation did not come into effect until 1926 because its neighbor, University Place, had to be annexed first in order to create contiguous city limits.

Unlike other Lincoln suburbs, such as Havelock, University Place, and College View, very little remains of the original town. Cotner College was demolished in the early 1950s and the land on which it stood was divided into single-family residential lots. The First State Bank of Bethany Heights is one of few landmarks from the original town and is not closely associated with the college or the town's foundation.

== See also ==
- Neighborhoods in Lincoln, Nebraska
- Union College (Nebraska)
- College View, Nebraska
- University of Nebraska–Lincoln
