= Vernon Dobson =

American Baptist minister and civil rights activist

Reverend Vernon Nathaniel Dobson (October 29, 1923 – January 26, 2013) was a Baptist minister and civil rights activist in Baltimore, Maryland.

== Early years ==
Vernon Dobson, the son of Rev. Spencer Dobson and Mrs. Estelle Cook Dobson, was born and raised in Baltimore, Maryland. He attended Booker T. Washington Middle School and graduated from Frederick Douglass Senior High School in 1941. He attended Howard University and earned a Bachelor of Divinity degree. He also studied at Harvard University. He had four brothers—Rev. Harold Dobson, Spencer G. Dobson, Jr., Irvin Dobson, and David C. Dobson—and one sister, Anne Dobson. Rev. Vernon Dobson was married to his wife, Napoleon B. Dobson, for over 60 years. They have six children together.

== Ministry ==
In 1958 Dobson was named assistant pastor of Union Baptist Church in Baltimore. He became the pastor of Union Baptist Church in 1963, and served in that role for 39 years. His predecessor, Rev. Harvey Johnson, was present at the founding of the Niagara Movement and of the NAACP. Dobson was twice elected the president of the Interdenominational Ministerial Alliance in Baltimore.

== Civil Rights activism ==
In 1963 Dobson was one of the many community activists who attempted to integrate Gwynn Oak Amusement Park. In 1998, The Baltimore Sun published for the first time the names of all the people arrested during the protests, and Dobson's name was found on the list. Their demonstration against the park was organized by the Congress of Racial Equality. Dobson was a member of the self-titled "Goon Squad," a group of Baltimore-based ministers and lawyers who advocated for civil rights. In 1967 they sought the reinstatement of Joseph C. Howard Sr., a prosecutor who had exposed Baltimore's unequal treatment of rape victims based on their race.

In 1968 Dobson founded the Union Baptist Church Head Start Program. He was one of the founders of Baltimoreans United in Leadership Development (BUILD) in 1977.

Reverend Dobson worked with many of the legendary civil rights activists of Baltimore, including Walter P. Carter, Parren J. Mitchell, Rev. Marion Bascom of Douglass Memorial Community Church, Sampson "Sam" Green, Rev. Wendell H. Phillips of Heritage United Church of Christ, Chester Wickwire, and Samuel T. Daniels, Sr. of the Prince Hall Masons.

Dobson's brother, Rev. Harold Dobson, was the first president of Baltimore's branch of Opportunities Industrialization Center, (OIC). OIC was founded in Philadelphia by Rev. Leon Sullivan.

Dobson was the co-host of Look At It This Way, a community affairs television show on WBAL-TV in Baltimore. Co-hosts included Samuel Thornton Daniels, Sr. and Homer Favor.
