= Al Que Quiere! =

Poem collection by William Carlos Williams

First edition

Al Que Quiere! is a collection of 52 poems by William Carlos Williams, published in 1917 by the Four Seas Company of Boston, Massachusetts. Williams paid $50 to the publisher. The original edition announces, "Many of the poems in this book have appeared in magazines, especially in Poetry, Others, The Egoist, and The Poetry Journal."

Williams's translation of the title is "To Him Who Wants It." He wrote of this, "I have always associated it with a figure on a soccer field: to him who wants the ball to be passed to him. [...] I was convinced nobody in the world of poetry wanted me but I was there willing to pass the ball if anyone did want it."

In this early work, Williams is still finding his voice, still experimenting with a variety of styles and approaches, but has eliminated "[r]hyme, conventional meter, figurative language, [and] literary associations."

The final poem in the original edition was the multi-part “The Wanderer: A Rococo Study,” which had been written before the other pieces. For The Collected Earlier Poems (New Directions, 1966), it was extracted from the section containing Al Que Quiere! and instead moved to the front to stand on its own.

== List of poems ==
- "Sub Terra"
- "Spring Song"
- "The Shadow"
- "Pastoral" (When I was younger...)
- "Chicory and Daisies"
- "Wieners"
- "Pastoral" (The little sparrows...)
- "Love Song" (Daisies are broken...)
- "Gulls"
- "Winter Sunset"
- "In Harbor"
- "Tract"
- "Apology"
- "Promenade"
- "Libertad! Igualidad! Fraternidad!"
- "Summer Song"
- "The Young Housewife"
- "Love Song" (Sweep the house clean...)
- "Dawn"
- "Hero"
- "Drink"
- "El Hombre"
- "Winter Quiet"
- "A Prelude"
- "Trees"
- "Canthara"
- "M. B."
- "Good Night"
- "Keller Gegen Dom"
- "Danse Russe"
- "Mujer"
- "Portrait of a Woman in Bed"
- "Virtue"
- "Smell!"
- "The Ogre"
- "Sympathetic Portrait of a Child"
- "Riposte"
- "K. McB."
- "The Old Men"
- "Spring Stains"
- "A Portrait in Greys"
- "Pastoral" (If I say I have heard voices...)
- "January Morning"
- "To a Solitary Disciple"
- "Ballet"
- "Dedication for a Plot of Ground"
- "Conquest"
- "First Version: 1915"
- "Love Song" (I lie here thinking of you:–)
- "The Wanderer: A Rococo Study" (Advent, Clarity, Broadway, The Strike, Abroad, Soothsay, St. James' Grove)
