= Four Seas Company =

American bookstore and small-press publisher

The Four Seas Company was a bookstore and small-press publisher in Boston, Massachusetts. It is remembered today mostly for its publication of the early work of major modernist writers such as William Faulkner, William Carlos Williams, Gertrude Stein, and Yone Noguchi. Four Seas was founded by the young Edmund R. Brown upon his graduation from Harvard College in 1910, and its imprint first appears in 1911. The last book published under the imprint was in 1930, the year the company was absorbed by Bruce Humphries, Inc.

== Notable publications ==
- Stephen Vincent Benét's first book, Five Men and Pompey (1915)
- William Carlos Williams, Al Que Quiere! (1917)
- John Gould Fletcher, Japanese Prints (1918)
- Yone Noguchi, Japanese Hokkus (1920)
- Olga Petrova, The White Peacock (1920)
- Gertrude Stein, Geography and Plays, (1922)
- William Faulkner's first book, The Marble Faun (1924)
- Harry Crosby, Chariot of the Sun (1929)
- The first two editions of Brazilian literature translated into English: Graca Aranha, Canaan (1920), and Isaac Goldberg, ed, Brazilian Tales (1921)
- The periodical Poetry Journal
