= Morris Goldseker =

American businessman (1898–1973)

- Born: December 24, 1898; Mlynov, Russian Empire
- Died: June 15, 1973
- Occupations: Real estate broker, investor, philanthropist
- Known for: Founder of M. Goldseker Real Estate Company, Morris Goldseker Foundation

Morris Goldseker (December 24, 1898 – June 15, 1973) was a real estate business tycoon, broker, and philanthropist. He was President and Founder of M. Goldseker Real Estate Company, a Baltimore-based real-estate brokerage and services company, and is the founder of the Morris Goldseker Foundation. Goldseker became a prominent real estate investor and broker and multi-millionaire in Baltimore during his forty-two years in the real estate business.

== Early years ==
Goldseker was a Jewish immigrant born in Mlynov, Russia (now called Mlyniv, Ukraine), the sixth of twelve children, of whom four died in infancy. His father was a fish rancher. Goldseker attended elementary and parochial school. He emigrated to the United States, arriving in Baltimore, Maryland on board of the ship Rhein on August 28, 1913.

His first job was at Fried Pants Shop, he then worked at his uncle's grocery store. In 1921 at age twenty-three, he and a partner acquired a grocery store. Soon after he began purchasing row homes for investment purposes. He taught himself the mechanics of real estate transactions, collecting rents, marketing, checking credit, and backgrounds of applicants, keeping books, paying bills, and forfeiting properties of tenants who did not pay.

== Business strategy ==
In 1931 Goldseker founded M. Goldseker Real Estate Company which was located at 218 West Franklin Street in downtown Baltimore. This remained his office for over forty years. His company managed thousands of real estate properties. During the economic downturn of the depression, Goldseker knew that foreclosures were imminent. He asked lending institutions if he could manage the properties that were in foreclosure. He then purchased the foreclosed homes he managed, paying off the properties in which he was the note holder, acquiring the reputation of a good risk with savings and loans institutions and banks. The Baltimore City Government agreed to let him manage 1400 city properties that were in disrepair or needed management services. His services included “efficiently renting, managing, and maintaining real estate. In addition to this, he also managed properties with the Federal Home Owner's Loan Corporation.

His business strategy included selling homes to people who were discriminated against, and who could not get mortgages, acquiring the reputation as the purveyor of the best homes black people could get. His market were people from a certain income brackets, specifically the lower middle class. According to nephew Sheldon Goldseker, “People whose income was steady but not high. They could keep their heads above water, but had little income left over to build a nest egg. They were families who did not have a lump sum savings that could be the down payment necessary to obtain a mortgage loan.”

Goldseker accomplished the American dream. He came to America, could not speak English, and was penniless. He died with assets worth more than 20 million dollars.

Some people question if this man "accomplished the American Dream", unless of course the American Dream means becoming rich by taking advantage of the poor. Here's another take on this man's activities and you judge for yourself: "the leading offender in Edmondson Village was Morris Goldseker, who tricked impoverished black families moving into Edmondson Village to sign contracts in which no equity was built up until the “sales price” was paid in full. According to W. Edward Orser, Blockbusting in Baltimore: The Edmondson Village Story (1994), not a single “buyer” was able to pay the debt in full — every contract resulted in foreclosure, many after years of timely payments, without the evicted family having a penny of equity in the house they thought they had bought."

== Allegations ==
In the late 1960s, a group called Activists, Inc., followed Goldseker's financing to major Maryland banks and analyzed his and other blockbusters′ business practices. In December 1969 a lawsuit was filed in which Goldseker was charged with price gouging, and entering into unfair contracts with unsuspecting patrons. Activists, Inc. claimed Goldseker made 85 percent profit, while Goldseker claimed he only netted about 19 percent profit on each house he sold, insisting that he was a fair dealer, providing a unique service to a difficult market. According to Antero Pietila, Goldseker secretly put the screws to Activist, Inc.′s chief witness against him in the civil suit, forcing the suit's withdrawal. Goldseker′s family strongly denounces the accusations.

== Morris Goldseker Foundation ==
Before Goldseker died, he devised the plan for his foundation, stating “the Foundation will give special consideration to charitable organizations, which, by loans or grants or other steps, give aid and encouragement to worthy individuals to continue their education, establish themselves in business, overcome adversities, or maintain support for themselves and their families.” The foundation, one of the largest philanthropic foundations in Maryland, was created in 1975 with $11 million from Goldseker′s estate. It supports nonprofit organizations helping communities and individuals in the Baltimore metropolitan area.

Several family members sit on the Board of Directors of the Foundation. Compensation for their service has routinely come into question; The Baltimore Sun in 2003 reported that Sheldon Goldseker, nephew of Morris Goldseker and Chairman of the Foundation, takes a six-figure salary, even when grants to the community were to be reduced.
