= Neighborhoods in Lincoln, Nebraska =

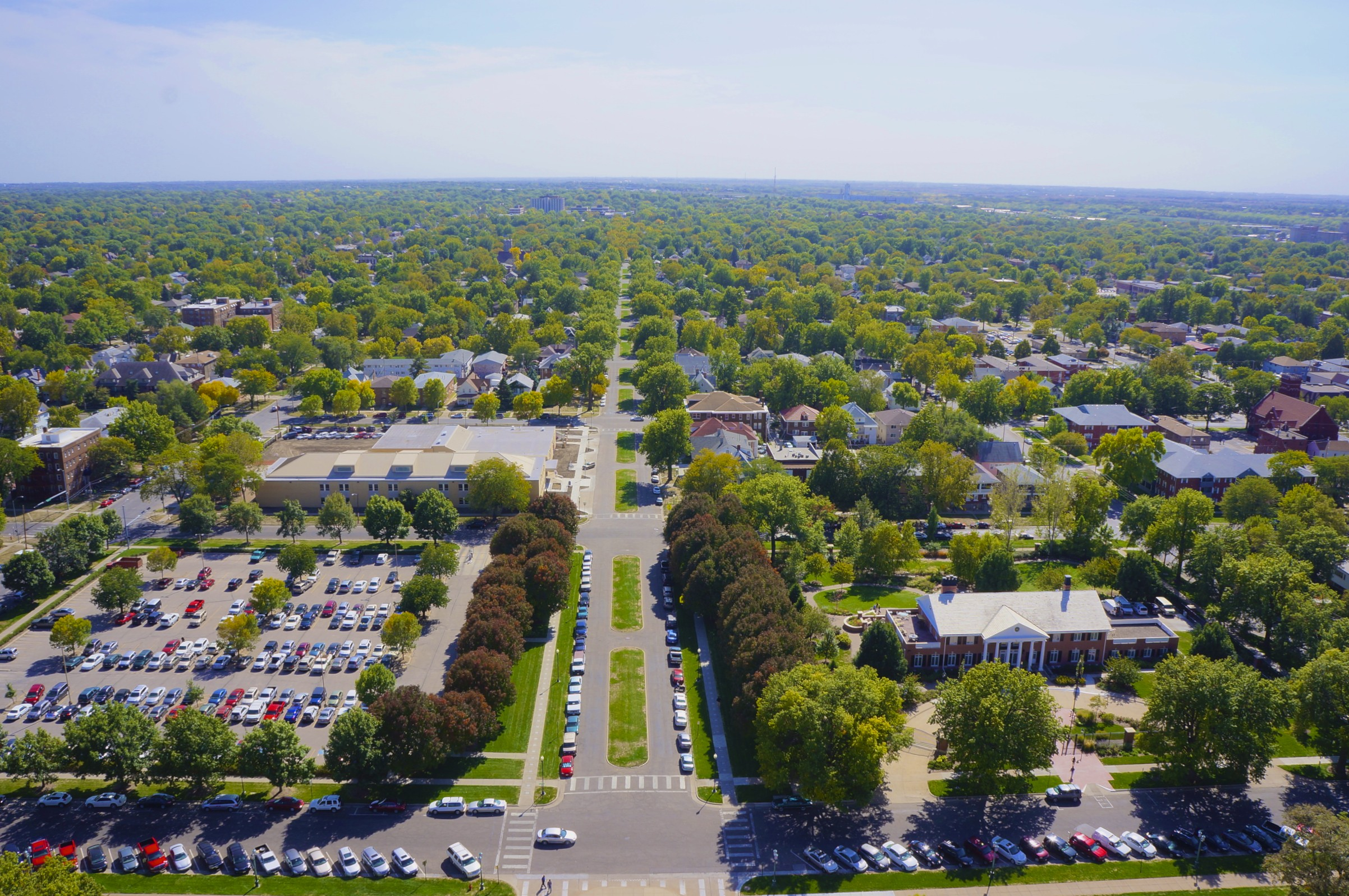
View of South Lincoln from the top of the Nebraska State Capitol

Lincoln, Nebraska has many neighborhoods, including 45 recognized by Urban Development, City of Lincoln. A list and description of neighborhoods within Lincoln city limits follows.

- 40th & A: An area from Randolph to South Streets/Normal Boulevard and from S. 33rd to S. 48th Streets.
- Antelope Park: An area from A to South Streets and from S. 27th Street to generally west of Antelope Park.
- Arnold Heights (Air Park): Located in far northwest Lincoln, this neighborhood, commonly known as Air Park, began as base housing for the adjacent Lincoln Air Force Base during the Cold War. The area originally consisted of 1,000 housing units and was annexed by Lincoln in 1966, after the base closed. All 1,000 units were originally managed by the Lincoln Housing Authority, but about half of the homes in the neighborhood have been sold to private owners. The area was also formerly known as both "Capehart Housing" when completed in 1960 (north housing) and the "Military Construction Area" when built during 1956 (south housing). Additional housing subdivisions were built in the area in the 1980s and 1990s. More recent additions include a mix of duplexes and single-family homes of various sizes, a Fresh N' Save Market grocery store, and a strip mall. As of May 2009, the area is continually being developed.
- Autumn Wood: Folkways to Fletcher. West of 27th.
- Belmont: The Belmont neighborhood lies just north of Cornhusker Highway and south of Superior Street between Interstate 180 and 14th Street.
- Bethany: Bethany is located along Cotner Boulevard and Holdrege Street. Originally laid out as a separate village by the Disciples of Christ, Bethany was incorporated as Bethany Heights in 1890 and annexed by Lincoln in 1922.
- Capitol Beach: This area is north of West O Street, just west of Downtown, and north of BNSF Railway's Hobson Yard. It is home to Capitol Beach Lake and Lakeview Elementary School.
- Capitol View: L to G, 13th to Capitol Parkway.
- Clinton: A north-central neighborhood centering around 27th and Holdrege streets, Clinton is diverse both ethnically and socio-economically. It features single-family homes and duplexes, with some small apartment buildings. Located between downtown and East Campus, with two major bike trails and several bus lines, Clinton is convenient for downtown workers and UNL students alike. The North 27th Street shopping district has many ethnic restaurants and markets. The Clinton Neighborhood Organization began in 1968 to fight the city’s Northeast Radial line, and is the city’s oldest and most active neighborhood organization.
- College View: College View is located along 48th Street and near Calvert Street, adjacent to and surrounding the Union College campus. In 1891, Union College was founded southeast of nearby Lincoln and a small village formed around it. The first post office was established in College View in 1891. In 1892, the village had grown to around 1,000 residents and was incorporated as College View. In 1929, the population of College View had grown to 2,900 people and was annexed by the City of Lincoln. The area is anchored by Union College but has many buildings resembling those of a small town. This business area serves the college and surrounding neighborhood. It has an eclectic mix of mostly local businesses.
- Colonial Hills: An area from Pioneers Boulevard to Old Cheney Road/Nebraska Highway and from S. 56th to S. 70th Streets. Colonial Hills also includes the area at and west of the College View Cemetery from S. 56th to S. 70th Streets.
- Country Club: An area from South Street to Nebraska Highway; generally east of S. 20th/S. 22nd Streets and west of the Rock Island Bicycle Trail. This neighborhood includes Sheridan Boulevard in south-central Lincoln. North of Calvert/High Streets, the Sheridan Boulevard area was the first addition to Lincoln that stepped away from the "grid pattern" into the winding side streets that characterize most modern residential areas. This area is listed under the National Registrar of Historic Places as the "Boulevards" district.
- Downtown: Lincoln's business district has a mix of offices, bars, restaurants and retail.
- East Campus: Located just south of the University of Nebraska's East Campus, from Holdrege to Vine and from 33rd to 48th Street, this neighborhood includes a historic district, commonly referred to as "Professors Row", and McAdams Park, which borders the Mo-Pac Bicycle Trail.
- Eastridge: Developed during the city's Eastward expansion, and followed by development of the Gateway Mall as the nucleus of Lincoln's retail, as department stores were closing downtown and opening there. It contains mostly single-level, ranch-style homes with built-on car ports and/or garages. Eastridge is currently one of the best preserved neighborhoods in Lincoln with houses built from 1950 to the mid 1960's. Each home was built by a local builder, Strauss Brothers Construction. Strauss Brothers had previously built Eastborough, and later built the Meadowlane, and Wedgewood neighborhoods, along with the Trend-Ridge apartment complex. Most Eastridge homes follow a "cookie cutter" design that was either an "L" shape or a rectangular shape. Eastridge Elementary is located within the neighborhood.
- Everett: Bound by H Street on the north, South on the South, 9th on the West, and 13th on the East.
- Fallbrook: Newer, developing community, located east of the airport and north of I-80; includes office parks, housing, a gym, middle school, supermarket, and a town center. Fallbrook hosts farmers' markets during seasonal months.
- Family Acres: 56th to 84th. Yankee Hill to Old Cheney. Also includes Old Cheney to Pioneers from 70th to 84th. It excludes a section West of 84 near Highway 2.
- Far South: Bounded by the Rock Island Bicycle Trail on the north, Mocking Bird Lane N. on the south, Densmore Park-east to S. 27th Street.
- Far Southeast: One of Lincoln's newest neighborhoods, this sprawling area has developed rapidly in the late 2000s and early 2010s, extending from 84th St to the west, 98th St to the east, Pioneers Blvd to the north and Pine Lake Rd to the south.
- Fox Hollow: Located in southeast Lincoln, from 70th to 84th Streets between Van Dorn Street and Pioneers Boulevard. Fox Hollow is a planned subdivision and was constructed during the 1970s to present.
- Greater South: South St to Nebraska Pkwy and 33rd to 40th.
- Hartley: One of Lincoln's earliest suburbs, Hartley is located east of the downtown proper, east of 27th Street and north of O Street. It is a mainly residential neighborhood of houses built 1890–1940.
- Havelock: Havelock is located along Havelock Avenue, east of 56th Street in northeast Lincoln. Havelock was founded in 1890 along the Burlington & Missouri River Railroad. Havelock was incorporated as a town in 1893 and by 1900 had a population of 1,500. In 1920s, as Lincoln was annexing other suburbs, Havelock residents refused to allow annexation. Only after an eight-year-long strike by the local Burlington Shops, which were an important part of Havelock's economy, did the citizens vote for annexation in 1930. Havelock has retained much of its sense of community, with many shops and restaurants and its own farmers market on Tuesday afternoons. Havelock was named for Sir Henry Havelock (1795-1857), an English general, the hero of the siege of Lucknow.
- Hawley: Located directly east of UNL's downtown campus, the Hawley Historic District was largely built in the early 20th century.
- Haymarket: One of Lincoln's oldest neighborhoods, the Haymarket is a historic warehouse and industrial district. In recent decades, it has become a dining, specialty shopping, and urban living district.
- High Ridge/Cushman: South and west of West O and SW 40th.
- Highlands: The Highlands is a newer residential neighborhood in northwest Lincoln, located north of I-80 and near Lincoln Airport.

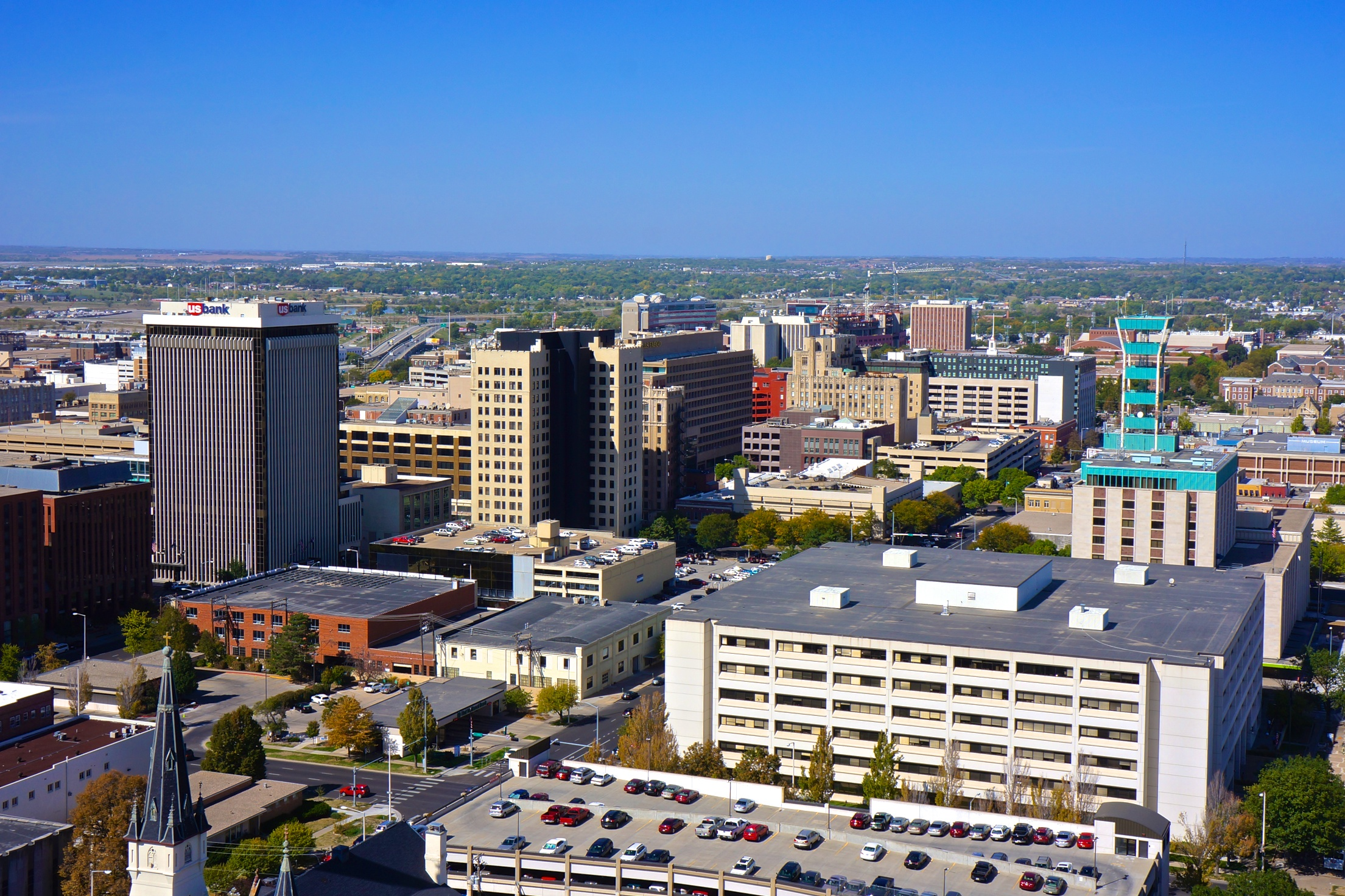
View of Downtown Lincoln from the top of the Nebraska State Capitol Building

- Hitching Post Hills: West Lincoln.
- Huskerville: A now non-existent neighborhood built north of Arnold Heights. Constructed during World War II, Huskerville was once the Lincoln Army Air Field hospital area from 1942 until 1945. After the war the area was converted into college housing and was most noted for a polio outbreak in 1952. The area was either removed or demolished in the late 1960s. The chapel, listed in the National Register of Historic Places, is all that remains of Huskerville.
- Indian Village: The Indian Village neighborhood is located from Van Dorn Street on the north to Nebraska Pkwy on the south, from 9th Street on the west to 20th Street on the east.
- Irvingdale: The Irvingdale neighborhood is located from South Street on the North, and Van Dorn on the South, from 9th Street from the west to 22nd Street on the east. The neighborhood has a mix of homes built in the early 1900s to more modern homes built in the 1950s, and is home to Irving Middle School, and the Stransky Park concert series.
- Landon's: Fairfield north to Superior and 27th west to between 21st and 20th.
- Malone: An area bounded by the old Missouri Pacific Railroad line on the north, "O" Street on the south and from N. 19th to N. 27th Streets.
- Meadowlane: 66th to 84th from O Street to Vine Street and 70th to 84th from Vine Street to Holdrege Street.
- Near South: Located from G Street on the north to South Street on the south, and from 13th Street from the west to 27th on the east. The neighborhood is home to many of Lincoln's grand historic homes and is currently experiencing a revitalization effort by the neighborhood association and city officials. Many homeowners are reconverting properties that were once divided into apartments back into single-family homes. The area is spotted with various homes of significant historical and architectural value.
- Pester Ridge: Near South 33rd and West Denton Road. Population of 6 in 2010.
- Piedmont: An area to the west of Eastridge. Bounded by S 48th to the west, S 56th to the east, A St to the south and Randolph St to the north. Includes a shopping center, drug store, automotive center, hair salon, middle school, church, park, and homes of various sizes.
- Porter Ridge: An area bounded by Pine Lake Road on the north, at about Whitlock Road-west on the south and from S. 27th to S. 32nd Streets.
- Riley: An area from Holdrege to "O" Streets and from N. 48th to N. 66th Streets.
- Russian Bottoms / [The] Bottoms: An area which encompasses both the North Bottoms and South Bottoms, originally settled by Germans from Russia.
  - North Bottoms: Directly north of UNL's downtown campus, the North Bottoms is an area in the floodplain of Salt Creek that holds many smaller houses now rented by a large number of UNL students. It is the northern part of an area originally settled by thousands of Volga-German immigrants from Russia.
  - South Bottoms: An area south of the Haymarket stretching to approximately 'A' St. The southern part of an area originally settled by thousands of Volga-German immigrants from Russia.
- Salt Valley View: An area from just north of Starview Lane to Old Cheney Road and from the BNSF Railway to N. 14th Street/Warlick Boulevard.
- South 48th: A narrow band from O to Nebraska Pkwy from about 46th to 50th.
- South Salt Creek: From O to Van Dorn and Salt Creek to 9th.
- Southern Hills: Just north of South Pointe Mall.
- Sunset Acres: From 27th Street to 48th Street and Superior Street to Highway 6.
- Taylor Park: An area generally located around Taylor Park in east-central Lincoln. Bounded by O St to the north, A St to the south, 48th St to the west and 70th St to the east.
- University Place: University Place is located along 48th Street between Leighton Avenue and Adams Street, near Nebraska Wesleyan University and UNL's East Campus. It was an incorporated community before its annexation by Lincoln in 1926. The area has its own historic shopping district and is characterized by homes with wrap around porches near the University's Old Main.
- West "A": The West "A" neighborhood is from West "O" to W. Van Dorn Streets and from Salt Creek on the east to SW 27th Street on the west. West "A" also includes the area from W. "A" to W. South Streets and from SW 40th to SW 27th Streets.
- West Lincoln: Located along W Cornhusker Hwy, the area was founded in 1887 and was an incorporated community before its annexation by Lincoln in 1966.
- Witherbee: An area from "O" to Randolph Street and from S. 33rd to S. 56th Streets.
- Woods Park (Historic Bungalow District): An area bounded by "O" Street on the north, S. 33rd Street on the east; generally north and east of Antelope Creek. It includes a number of bungalows built around the 1910s and 1920s. The Lincoln Children's Zoo (formerly Folsom Children's Zoo) & Botanical Gardens is located near this neighborhood.
- Yankee Hill: Located south of Wilderness Ridge. Borders are West Van Dorn on the north, West Old Cheney on the south, Coddington on the west and South 1st on the east.
