= Walter P. Carter =

American activist

- Born: April 29, 1923; Monroe, North Carolina, U.S.
- Died: July 31, 1971 (aged 48); Baltimore, Maryland, U.S.
- Education: North Carolina A&T State University (BA); Howard University (MSW)
- Organization(s): Congress of Racial Equality; Student Nonviolent Coordinating Committee
- Movement: Civil Rights Movement
- Children: Jill

Walter Percival Carter (April 29, 1923 – July 31, 1971) was an activist and central figure in Baltimore, Maryland during the Civil Rights Movement. He earned that designation by organizing demonstrations against discrimination throughout Maryland. Carter is best known for his work as the chairman of the Baltimore chapter of the Congress of Racial Equality (CORE) from 1960 to 1963 and as the Maryland coordinator for the 1963 March on Washington. A hospital, an elementary school, a recreation center, a college library, and a day-care center in Baltimore have been named in his memory.

== Early life ==
Carter was the seventh of nine children born to Carrie P. and Walter Carter Sr. in Monroe, North Carolina. He received his bachelor's degree from North Carolina A&T, where he participated in voter registration, the debate team, and became a member of the Progressive Party. He was well liked by his classmates and admired for his keen intellect and unusual sense of humor. Carter obtained a Master's Degree in Social Work (MSW) at Howard University. While studying at Howard, he met young Stokely Carmichael and the two became friends.

== Civil Rights activism ==
Carter was a World War II veteran. He led voter registration drives in the South. As chairman of the local chapter of Congress of Racial Equality, he helped to organize the 1960 Freedom Rides to the Eastern Shore of Maryland, Gwynn Oak Park, Howard Johnson Chain, and other eating establishments along Routes 40, 1, 150, and 50; apartment buildings, hotels, and other public accommodations throughout Maryland. In 1963, he served as the Maryland coordinator of the March on Washington and, in 1965, he was a coordinator of the Federated Civil Rights Organization march with over 3,000 people protesting housing segregation.

In 1963, Carter created the William L. Moore Foundation, for fellow CORE activist and Baltimorean William L. Moore. Moore was marching to the mansion of the Alabama state Governor to deliver a letter. While embarking on this lone march on April 23, 1963, in Gadsden, Alabama, Moore was shot and killed. His body was found by a passing motorist. The letter that Moore intending on giving to the Governor was later found but never delivered to the Governor of Alabama.

In 1966, Carter and five other members of CORE formed Activists for Fair Housing, later shortened to Activists, Inc. That same year, the Apartment House Owners Association of Maryland was forced to open facilities to all. In the late 1960s, Carter convinced the Community Chest, now known as the United Way of Central Maryland, to fund grassroots organizations with African American constituents, such as Echo House. Carter protested segregated housing and poor living conditions that African Americans faced in Baltimore in the late 1950s and through the 1960s. He organized protest marches, often taking the fight to the homes of the white landlords who owned the segregated housing.

Carter was appointed by Mayor Thomas L. J. D'Alesandro III, to head the Community Action Agency (CAA). But the Baltimore City Council voted 10–8 on September 30, 1968, to not confirm Carter's appointment. According to news accounts, William Donald Schaefer complained that Carter was "too radical", and would move the agency forward at a pace at which the city was not yet ready. Due to Carter's rejection, 12 of 21 members of the Community Action Committee, and three top members of the Urban Coalition including Parren J. Mitchell resigned from their positions to protest the rejection of Carter's nomination.

== Death and legacy ==
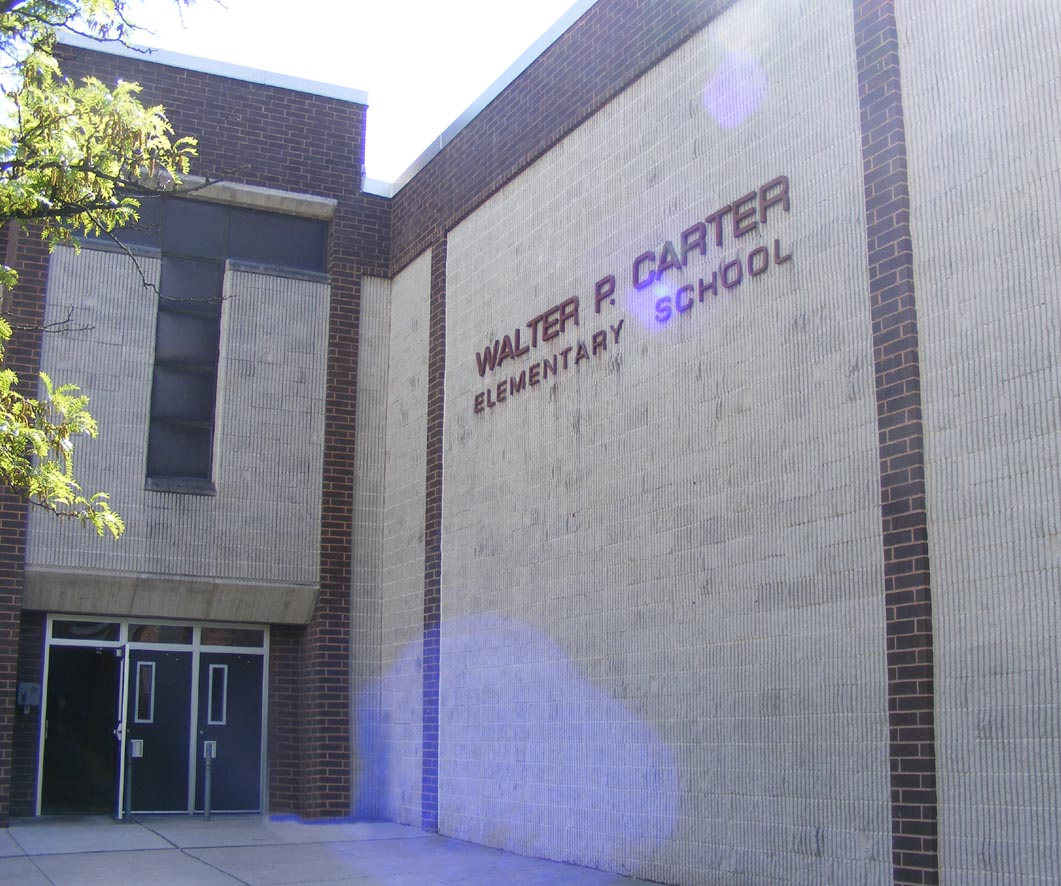
Walter P. Carter Elementary School

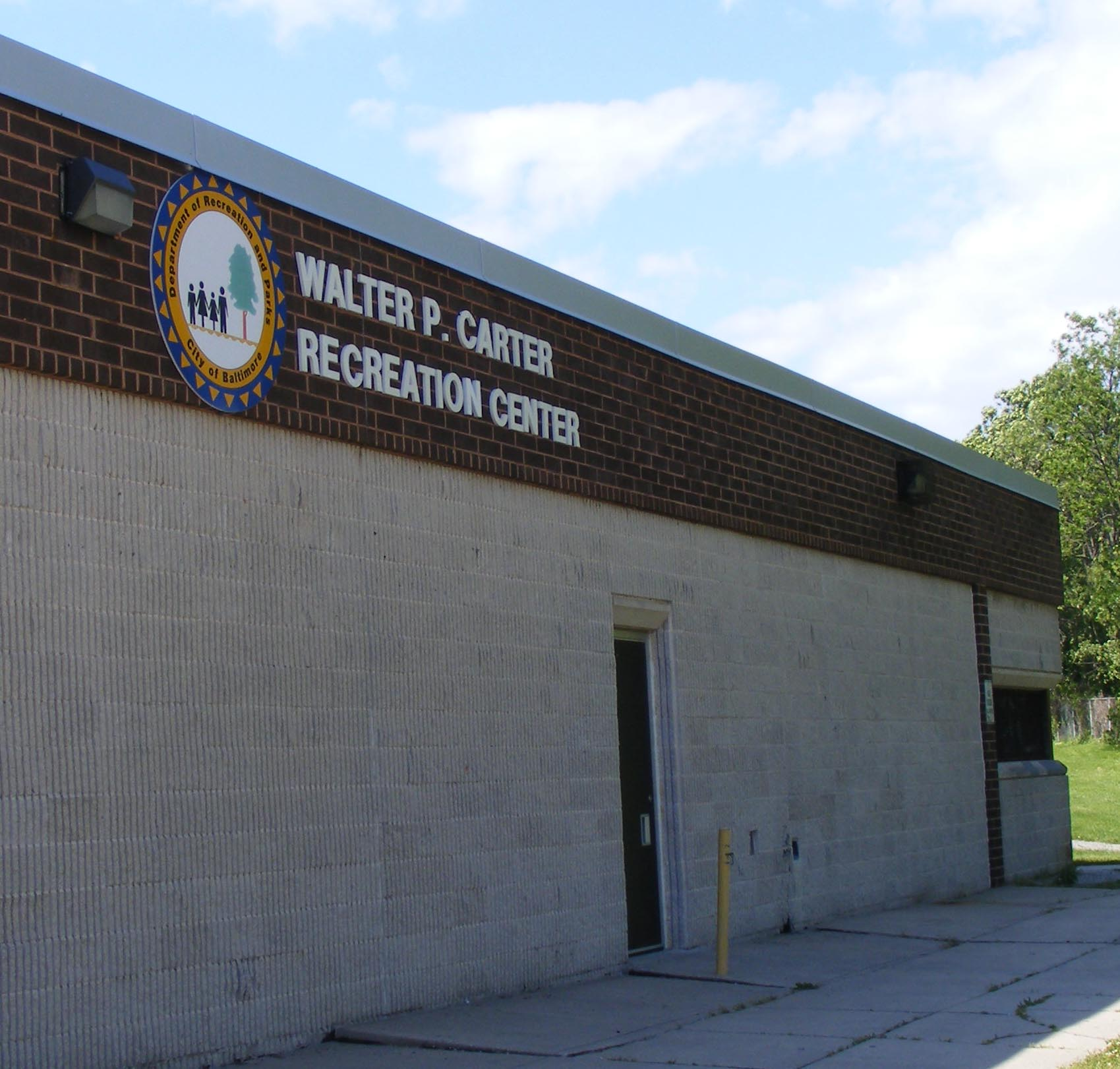
Walter P. Carter Recreation Center

Carter died on July 31, 1971, as he was giving a report to the Black United Front, a coalition of "militant" and "moderate" Civil Rights organizations, at Rev. Vernon Dobson's Union Baptist Church in Baltimore. The day before, Carter had won a court battle against Morris Goldseker. Goldseker had sought an injunction against Carter, who had been picketing and leading protests outside Goldseker's office, calling on him to "Stop the Black Tax", referring to the excessive fees charged in his rent-to-own schemes in an effort to scam blacks out of their rights to homeownership. Goldseker had a notorious history of also engaging in a practice known as Blockbusting. Walter Carter protested against these and other discriminatory housing practices.

Congressman Parren Mitchell added this to the Congressional Record:

Mr. Speaker, the State of Maryland last week, lost one of the most able civil rights leaders in the person of Walter P. Carter. Expressions of sympathy have come from across the nation and around the world. I think this should be a very special lesson to this House to learn that there are whites who recognize the contributions of a man who articulates black identity and black awareness.

The Walter P. Carter Mental Health Hospital was established on 630 West Fayette Street in Baltimore in 1976 in Carter's honor. That hospital closed in 2009. Many of its outpatient services were moved to a building operated by the University of Maryland Medical Center on 701 West Pratt Street. That building was renamed the Walter P. Carter Center, and its dedication occurred on January 5, 2010. Demolition of the original building began in early 2017 with plans to turn the site into a 300-space parking lot.

There is also a day care center, a public school and a college library in Baltimore named for Carter. Every year, the children at the Walter P. Carter Elementary School participate in a "Walter P. Carter Day" program where they come up with different ways of celebrating his legacy.

In 2012, Carter's relentless struggle for human and civil rights was the subject of a documentary film produced by the University of Maryland School of Psychiatry: Walter P. Carter: Champion for Change. In the film, Carter is referred to as the "Martin Luther King of Maryland". The film will air on Maryland Public Television February 25, 2013, at 10:30 p.m.

== Family ==
Carter's younger daughter, Jill Priscilla Carter, is an attorney and member of the Senate of Maryland, elected November 6, 2018. She is a former member of the Maryland House of Delegates having served from 2003 to 2016. Carter's elder daughter, Judith Lynn, is married to Baltimore City circuit court Judge Sylvester B. Cox and together they have two daughters, Lindsey and Erin. Lindsey Carter Cox, so named in honor of her grandfather, is a graduate of Howard University, Erin Taylor Cox, the younger of the granddaughters was the All-City Volleyball Champion in 2008, and a graduate of Morgan State University in Baltimore, where she was a member of the volleyball team. Walter Carter married Zerita Joy Richardson Carter in 1954 and they remained married until his untimely death on July 31, 1971. Mrs. Carter was an early childhood education teacher. She died on June 16, 2016.
