= College View, Nebraska =

Unincorporated community in Nebraska, United States

- Neighborhood
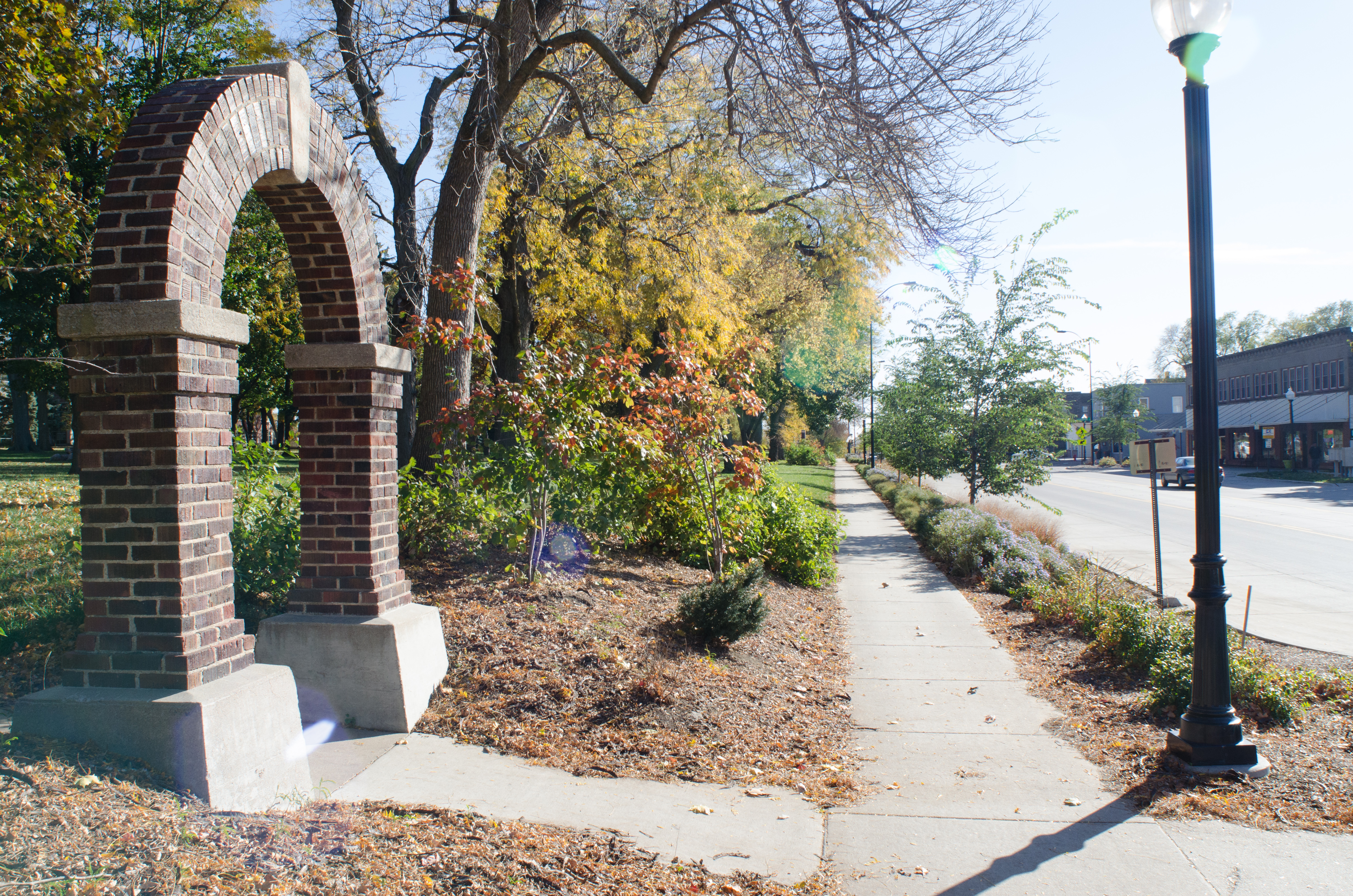
- College View neighborhood at Union College in Lincoln, Nebraska

- Location in Nebraska Location in the United States
- Coordinates: Community 40°46′20″N 96°39′08″W
- Country: United States
- State: Nebraska
- County: Lancaster
- Elevation: 1,303 ft (397 m)
- Time zone: UTC-6 (Central (CST))
  - Summer (DST): UTC-5 (CDT)
- ZIP code: 68506
- Area code: 402
- FIPS code: 31-09900
- GNIS feature ID: 828264

College View is a neighborhood in southeast Lincoln, Nebraska, United States which was previously a village in Lancaster County.

== History ==
In 1891, Union College was founded southeast of nearby Lincoln and a small village formed around it. The first post office was established in College View in 1891. In 1892, the village had grown to around 1,000 residents and was incorporated as College View.

During the second world war, Medical Recruits marched and trained in College View. There are pictures of soldiers such as Desmond T. Doss marching under the Clocktower on the Union College campus.

In 1929, the population of College View had grown to 2,900 people. The city of Lincoln had grown southward and annexed College View in 1929.

Since annexation, College View has become a vibrant neighborhood in Lincoln. The area is home to many small businesses and historic buildings. Union College continues to operate.

== See also ==
- Neighborhoods in Lincoln, Nebraska
