= Union Adventist University =

Seventh-day Adventist university in Lincoln, Nebraska, US

Coordinates: 40.775°N 96.652°W

- Former name: Union College
- Motto: Erunt Omnes Docibiles Dei (Latin)
- Motto in English: They shall be taught of God (from John 6:45)
- Type: Private college
- Established: 1891
- Religious affiliation: Seventh-day Adventist Church
- Academic affiliations: NAICU; CIC
- President: Yamileth Bazan
- Faculty: 58 (full-time); 73 (part-time)
- Students: 705 (2022-2023)
- Location: Lincoln, Nebraska, U.S.
- Campus: 50 acres (20 ha); Suburban
- Colors: |Red, black, and gold
- Nickname: Warriors
- Sporting affiliations: NCCAA
- Website: uau.edu

Union Adventist University is a private college in Lincoln, Nebraska, United States. Known as Union College from 1891 to May 5, 2024, it is owned and operated by the Mid-America Union Conference of the Seventh-day Adventist Church. It is accredited by the Adventist Accrediting Association (AAA) and the Higher Learning Commission. It is a part of the Seventh-day Adventist education system.

== History ==
Union Adventist University was formed in 1891 as Union College. Union College was formed following L. A. Hoopes, several church leaders, and W. W. Prescott began developing an Adventist college in the Midwestern United States. They secured a site south of Lincoln, Nebraska, which became the town of College View. The campus began construction that same year, and academic classes officially began in September 1891. In 1907, the boiler house of Union College was destroyed by a fire of unknown cause. The building had been used for electricity and other utilities.

College View was later annexed by the city of Lincoln on April 30, 1929. In the 1970s, Union College began a series of major expansions. The original clock tower was replaced with a 100 foot (30 m) tall steel clocktower in 1971. The original administration building was replaced by the Everett Dick Administration Building in 1975, and the former was subsequently demolished. Additionally, the college purchased the radio station KUCV in 1976 and placed it in the College View Public Library. Union College later sold the station to Nebraska Public Media in 1989.

In 2024, Union College officially changed its name to Union Adventist University. The college claimed that the name change was because too many other organizations shared the name, and to prevent further confusion, the change had to happen.

== Campus ==
Union Adventist University's main campus is located in the College View neighborhood of Lincoln, Nebraska. The campus has a total size of 50-acre (20 ha). Major buildings and structures on the campus include the 100 foot (30 m) steel clocktowe, and the Everett Dick Administration Building. The oldest building on campus, College View Public Library, was built in 1916 as a Carnegie library and is listed on the National Register of Historic Places. The campus is also the location of the Joshua C. Turner Arboretum, a site of the Nebraska Statewide Arboretum, hosting over 100 species of plants.

== Academics ==
Undergraduate demographics as of 2025
| Race and ethnicity | Total |
|---|---|
| White | 48% |
| Hispanic | 28% |
| International student | 9% |
| Two or more races | 3% |
| Black | 7% |
| Asian | 5% |
| Unknown | 3% |
Economic diversity
| Low-income (Note: The percentage of students who received an income-based federal Pell grant intended for low-income students.) | 35% |
| Affluent (Note: The percentage of students who are a part of the American middle class at the bare minimum.) | 65% |

Union Adventist University is a private college. As of 2025, the college has 439 undergraduate students. The college includes eight colleges. Colleges include Business and Computer Science, Emergency Management and Exercise Science, Fine Arts, Human Development, Humanities, Nursing, Religion, Science & Math. In addition to undergraduate degrees, the college offers Masters programs in Leadership, Occupational Therapy, Public Health, and Physician Assistant Studies.

== Athletics ==
In athletics, Union plays as the Warriors and fields a limited number of sports, but is not a member of a major college sports association but rather the Association of Christian College Athletics (ACCA). As such, their teams tend to play against bible colleges, community colleges, and JV teams. The university also hosts three tournaments each year (one for basketball, soccer, and volleyball) for Seventh-day Adventist high school teams.

== Notable people ==
=== Alumni ===
- Laura Fenton, racquetball athlete
- Wayne Hooper, gospel music composer
- T. R. M. Howard, civil rights leader, entrepreneur, hospital owner
- Rukebai Inabo, Senator of Palau
- Milton E. Kern, educator
- Sandra Pierantozzi, former Vice President of Palau
- Chester Wickwire, chaplain, civil rights and peace activist

=== Faculty ===
- Jonathan M. Butler, historian
- Frank Lewis Marsh, biologist, educator
- John G. Matteson, minister who brought the Seventh-day Adventist Church to Denmark
- Mike Mennard, recording artist, current literature and communications lecturer

== See also ==
- List of Seventh-day Adventist colleges and universities
- Seventh-day Adventist education
