= List of Virginia Cavaliers men's basketball seasons =

This is a list of seasons completed by the Virginia Cavaliers men's basketball team. The Cavaliers won the NCAA Tournament Championship in 2019. The team was a charter member of the Southern Conference in 1921 until becoming an independent in 1937 and finally a member of the Atlantic Coast Conference in 1953. Virginia has finished first in the ACC a total of nine times, which is third best all-time.

== Season-by-season results ==
Statistics overview
Season	Coach	Overall	Conference	Standing	Postseason
Henry Lannigan (Independent) (1905–1907)
1905–06	Henry Lannigan	8–2			
1906–07	Henry Lannigan	5–3			
Henry Lannigan (South Atlantic Intercollegiate Athletic Association) (1907–1921)
1907–08	Henry Lannigan	5–5			
1908–09	Henry Lannigan	6–3			
1909–10	Henry Lannigan	12–4			
1910–11	Henry Lannigan	10–5			
1911–12	Henry Lannigan	7–4			
1912–13	Henry Lannigan	11–4			
1913–14	Henry Lannigan	12–1–1			
1914–15	Henry Lannigan	17–0			
1915–16	Henry Lannigan	11–2			
1916–17	Henry Lannigan	7–5			
1917–18	Henry Lannigan	7–1			
1918–19	Henry Lannigan	11–4			
1919–20	Henry Lannigan	10–3			
1920–21	Henry Lannigan	13–5			
Henry Lannigan (Southern Conference) (1921–1929)
1921–22	Henry Lannigan	17–1	5–0	1st	
1922–23	Henry Lannigan	12–5	1–3	15th	
1923–24	Henry Lannigan	12–3	3–2	7th	
1924–25	Henry Lannigan	14–3	4–2	T–6th	
1925–26	Henry Lannigan	9–6	4–4	T–10th	
1926–27	Henry Lannigan	9–10	5–7	13th	
1927–28	Henry Lannigan	20–6	10–5	7th	
1928–29	Henry Lannigan	9–10	5–7	15th	
Henry Lannigan:		254–95–1 (.727)			
Roy Randall (Southern Conference) (1929–1930)
1929–30	Roy Randall	3–12	2–8	19th	
Roy Randall:		3–12 (.200)			
Gus Tebell (Southern Conference) (1930–1937)
1930–31	Gus Tebell	11–9	5–6	13th	
1931–32	Gus Tebell	13–8	6–3	T–5th	
1932–33	Gus Tebell	12–6	5–3	T–5th	
1933–34	Gus Tebell	7–11	1–9	8th	
1934–35	Gus Tebell	13–9	7–5	4th	
1935–36	Gus Tebell	11–13	4–8	7th	
1936–37	Gus Tebell	9–10	6–7	8th	
Gus Tebell (Independent) (1937–1951)
1937–38	Gus Tebell	6–10			
1938–39	Gus Tebell	15–5			
1939–40	Gus Tebell	16–5			
1940–41	Gus Tebell	18–6			
1941–42	Gus Tebell	7–10			NIT quarterfinal
1942–43	Gus Tebell	8–13			
1943–44	Gus Tebell	11–8			
1944–45	Gus Tebell	13–4			
1945–46	Gus Tebell	12–5			
1946–47	Gus Tebell	10–11			
1947–48	Gus Tebell	16–10			
1948–49	Gus Tebell	13–10			
1949–50	Gus Tebell	12–13			
1950–51	Gus Tebell	8–14			
Gus Tebell:		241–190 (.559)			
Evan Male (Independent) (1951–1953)
1951–52	Evan Male	11–13			
1952–53	Evan Male	10–13			
Evan Male (Atlantic Coast Conference) (1953–1957)
1953–54	Evan Male	16–11	1–4	7th	
1954–55	Evan Male	14–15	5–9	6th	
1955–56	Evan Male	10–17	3–11	7th	
1956–57	Evan Male	6–19	3–11	7th	
Evan Male:		67–88 (.432)	12–35 (.255)		
Billy McCann (Atlantic Coast Conference) (1957–1963)
1957–58	Billy McCann	10–13	6–8	5th	
1958–59	Billy McCann	11–14	6–8	5th	
1959–60	Billy McCann	6–18	1–13	8th	
1960–61	Billy McCann	3–23	2–12	8th	
1961–62	Billy McCann	5–18	2–12	8th	
1962–63	Billy McCann	5–20	3–11	8th	
Billy McCann:		40–106 (.274)	20–64 (.238)		
Bill Gibson (Atlantic Coast Conference) (1963–1974)
1963–64	Bill Gibson	8–16	4–10	7th	
1964–65	Bill Gibson	7–18	3–11	7th	
1965–66	Bill Gibson	7–15	4–10	7th	
1966–67	Bill Gibson	9–17	4–10	7th	
1967–68	Bill Gibson	9–16	5–9	5th	
1968–69	Bill Gibson	10–15	5–9	6th	
1969–70	Bill Gibson	10–15	3–11	7th	
1970–71	Bill Gibson	15–11	6–8	5th	
1971–72	Bill Gibson	21–7	8–4	3rd	NIT first round
1972–73	Bill Gibson	13–12	4–8	5th	
1973–74	Bill Gibson	11–16	4–8	4th	
Bill Gibson:		120–158 (.432)	50–98 (.338)		
Terry Holland (Atlantic Coast Conference) (1974–1990)
1974–75	Terry Holland	12–13	4–8	5th	
1975–76	Terry Holland	18–12	4–8	6th	NCAA Division I first round
1976–77	Terry Holland	12–17	2–10	7th	
1977–78	Terry Holland	20–8	6–6	4th	NIT first round
1978–79	Terry Holland	19–10	7–5	3rd	NIT second round
1979–80	Terry Holland	24–10	7–7	5th	NIT Champion
1980–81	Terry Holland	29–4	13–1	1st	NCAA Division I Final Four
1981–82	Terry Holland	30–4	12–2	T–1st	NCAA Division I Sweet Sixteen
1982–83	Terry Holland	29–5	12–2	T–1st	NCAA Division I Elite Eight
1983–84	Terry Holland	21–12	6–8	6th	NCAA Division I Final Four
1984–85	Terry Holland	17–16	3–11	8th	NIT quarterfinal
1985–86	Terry Holland	19–11	7–7	5th	NCAA Division I first round
1986–87	Terry Holland	21–10	8–6	4th	NCAA Division I first round
1987–88	Terry Holland	13–18	5–9	6th	
1988–89	Terry Holland	22–11	9–5	3rd	NCAA Division I Elite Eight
1989–90	Terry Holland	20–12	6–8	5th	NCAA Division I second round
Terry Holland:		326–173 (.653)	111–103 (.519)		
Jeff Jones (Atlantic Coast Conference) (1990–1998)
1990–91	Jeff Jones	21–12	6–8	6th	NCAA Division I first round
1991–92	Jeff Jones	20–13	8–8	5th	NIT Champion
1992–93	Jeff Jones	21–10	9–7	5th	NCAA Division I Sweet Sixteen
1993–94	Jeff Jones	18–13	8–8	4th	NCAA Division I second round
1994–95	Jeff Jones	25–9	12–4	T–1st	NCAA Division I Elite Eight
1995–96	Jeff Jones	12–15	6–10	7th	
1996–97	Jeff Jones	18–13	7–9	6th	NCAA Division I first round
1997–98	Jeff Jones	11–19	3–13	9th	
Jeff Jones:		146–104 (.584)	59–67 (.468)		
Pete Gillen (Atlantic Coast Conference) (1998–2005)
1998–99	Pete Gillen	14–16	4–12	9th	
1999–00	Pete Gillen	19–12	9–7	3rd	NIT first round
2000–01	Pete Gillen	20–9	9–7	4th	NCAA Division I first round
2001–02	Pete Gillen	17–12	7–9	5th	NIT first round
2002–03	Pete Gillen	16–16	6–10	6th	NIT second round
2003–04	Pete Gillen	18–13	6–10	8th	NIT second round
2004–05	Pete Gillen	14–15	4–12	11th	
Pete Gillen:		118–93 (.559)	45–67 (.402)		
Dave Leitao (Atlantic Coast Conference) (2005–2009)
2005–06	Dave Leitao	15–15	7–9	7th	NIT first round
2006–07	Dave Leitao	21–11	11–5	T–1st	NCAA Division I second round
2007–08	Dave Leitao	17–16	5–11	10th	CBI semifinal
2008–09	Dave Leitao	10–18	4–12	11th	
Dave Leitao:		63–60 (.512)	27–37 (.422)		
Tony Bennett (Atlantic Coast Conference) (2009–2024)
2009–10	Tony Bennett	15–16	5–11	9th	
2010–11	Tony Bennett	16–15	7–9	8th	
2011–12	Tony Bennett	22–10	9–7	4th	NCAA Division I first round
2012–13	Tony Bennett	23–12	11–7	4th	NIT quarterfinal
2013–14	Tony Bennett	30–7	16–2	1st	NCAA Division I Sweet Sixteen
2014–15	Tony Bennett	30–4	16–2	1st	NCAA Division I second round
2015–16	Tony Bennett	29–8	13–5	2nd	NCAA Division I Elite Eight
2016–17	Tony Bennett	23–11	11–7	T–5th	NCAA Division I second round
2017–18	Tony Bennett	31–3	17–1	1st	NCAA Division I first round
2018–19	Tony Bennett	35–3	16–2	T–1st	NCAA Division I Champion
2019–20	Tony Bennett	23–7	15–5	T–2nd	No postseason held
2020–21	Tony Bennett	18–7	13–4	1st	NCAA Division I first round
2021–22	Tony Bennett	21–14	12–8	6th	NIT quarterfinal
2022–23	Tony Bennett	25–8	15–5	T–1st	NCAA Division I first round
2023–24	Tony Bennett	23–11	13–7	3rd	NCAA Division I First Four
Tony Bennett:		364–136 (.728)	189–82 (.697)		
Ron Sanchez (interim) (Atlantic Coast Conference) (2024–2025)
2024–25	Ron Sanchez	15–17	8–12	T–9th	
Ron Sanchez:		15–17 (.469)	8–12 (.400)		
Ryan Odom (Atlantic Coast Conference) (2025–present)
2025–26	Ryan Odom	30–6	15–3	2nd	NCAA Division I Second round
Ryan Odom:		30–6 (.833)	15–3 (.833)		
Total:		1,787–1,238–1 (.591)	547–568 (.491)		
National champion Postseason invitational champion Conference regular season champion Conference regular season and conference tournament champion Division regular season champion Division regular season and conference tournament champion Conference tournament champion
