= 1909–10 University of Virginia men's basketball team =

American college basketball season

1909–10 University of Virginia men's basketball
- Conference: South Atlantic Intercollegiate Athletic Association
- Record: 12–4 (2–1 SAIAA)
- Head coach: Henry Lannigan (5th season)
- Home arena: Fayerweather Gymnasium

The 1909–10 University of Virginia men's basketball team represented the University of Virginia during the 1909–10 IAAUS men's basketball season. The team was led by fifth-year head coach Henry Lannigan, and played their home games at Fayerweather Gymnasium in Charlottesville, Virginia. Now known as the Virginia Cavaliers, the team did not have an official nickname prior to 1923.

== Schedule ==
Date time, TV	Opponent	Result	Record	Site city, state
Regular season
December 5* no, no	Jefferson School	W 17–5	1–0	Fayerweather Gymnasium; Charlottesville, VA
December 27* no, no	vs. Newport News YMCA	L 12–24	1–1	Norfolk, VA
December 28* no, no	vs. Hampton YMCA	W 39–14	2–1	Norfolk, VA
January 8 no, no	William & Mary	W 36–16	3–1 (1–0)	Fayerweather Gymnasium; Charlottesville, VA
January 15* no, no	Randolph–Macon	W 45–15	4–1 (1–0)	Fayerweather Gymnasium; Charlottesville, VA
January 22* no, no	Hampden–Sydney	W 39–11	5–1 (1–0)	Fayerweather Gymnasium; Charlottesville, VA
January 28* no, no	at VMI	W 21–17	6–1 (1–0)	Lexington, VA
January 29* no, no	at Washington and Lee	L 21–35	6–2 (1–0)	Lexington, VA
February 2 no, no	at Georgetown	L 20–32	6–3 (1–1)	Odd Fellows Hall; Washington, DC
February 3* no, no	at Baltimore Medical	W 21–3	7–3 (1–1)	Baltimore, Maryland
February 4* no, no	at St. John’s	W 29–16	8–3 (1–1)	Annapolis, MD
February 5* no, no	at Navy	L 6–55	8–4 (1–1)	Dahlgren Hall; Annapolis, MD
February 12* no, no	George Washington	W 48–16	9–4 (1–1)	Fayerweather Gymnasium; Charlottesville, VA
February 21* no, no	Washington & Lee	W 51–7	10–4 (1–1)	Fayerweather Gymnasium; Charlottesville, VA
February 26 no, no	Georgetown	W 27–26	11–4 (2–1)	Fayerweather Gymnasium; Charlottesville, VA
March 1* no, no	VMI	W 56–21	12–4 (2–1)	Fayerweather Gymnasium; Charlottesville, VA
*Non-conference game. (#) Tournament seedings in parentheses. All times are in Eastern Time.
