= Virginia Cavaliers baseball =

College baseball team of the University of Virginia

Virginia Cavaliers
- 2026 Virginia Cavaliers baseball team
- Founded: 1889; 137 years ago
- University: University of Virginia
- Head coach: Chris Pollard (1st season)
- Conference: ACC; Coastal Division
- Location: Charlottesville, Virginia
- Home stadium: Davenport Field at Disharoon Park (capacity: 5,919)
- Nickname: Cavaliers, Omahoos
- Colors: Orange and blue

College World Series champions
- 2015

College World Series runner-up
- 2014

College World Series appearances
- 2009, 2011, 2014, 2015, 2021, 2023, 2024

NCAA regional champions
- 2009, 2010, 2011, 2013, 2014, 2015, 2021, 2023, 2024

NCAA tournament appearances
- 1972, 1985, 1996, 2004, 2005, 2006, 2007, 2008, 2009, 2010, 2011, 2012, 2013, 2014, 2015, 2016, 2017, 2021, 2022, 2023, 2024, 2026

Conference tournament champions
- 1996, 2009, 2011

Conference regular season champions
- 1972, 2010, 2011

The Virginia Cavaliers baseball team represents the University of Virginia in NCAA Division I college baseball. Established in 1889, the team participates in the Coastal division of the Atlantic Coast Conference and plays its home games at Davenport Field at Disharoon Park. The team's head coach is Chris Pollard. The team has reached the College World Series seven times, most recently in 2024, and won the national championship in 2015.

== History ==
Virginia played its first baseball game, a 13–4 win over Richmond College, in 1889. The Cavaliers had limited success in their first 100 years of play, winning their first ACC regular season title and making their NCAA tournament debut in 1972 under Jim West and returning in 1985 and 1996 under Dennis Womack, failing to advance past regional play. They won their first ACC tournament championship in 1996 behind the pitching of All-American righthander Seth Greisinger. One highlight was the performance of left-handed pitcher Eppa Rixey, who won 266 games for the Philadelphia Phillies and Cincinnati Reds from 1912 to 1933 and was inducted into the Baseball Hall of Fame as a Veterans Committee selection in 1963.

In 1966, left-handed pitcher Edward Turnbull became the program's first MLB draft pick, going to the Baltimore Orioles in the 17th round. Outfielder Brian Buchanan was the first Virginia player to become a first-round pick, going to the New York Yankees in the 1994 draft.

=== Tiering proposal and Davenport Field ===
In 2001, the program was threatened by recommendations from a university task force that would have split the school's sports into four tiers, with each tier funded differently. The baseball program was placed in the lowest tier and would have lost the ability to offer athletic scholarships if the recommendation was implemented, but the university's Board of Visitors rejected the proposal.

The next year, the Virginia athletic department took steps to increase the program's competitiveness, notably renovating the team's stadium, which was renamed Davenport Field after longtime athletic administrator and former baseball coach Ted Davenport, who had died in 2001. The expansion was funded by $2 million in anonymous donations, believed to have come from bestselling author John Grisham, a Charlottesville resident whose son, Ty, played for the team. Before the renovation, the field did not have lights, and the infield was made of artificial turf handed down from an old football facility. Bermuda grass was installed during the renovations.

=== Brian O'Connor era ===
Womack stepped down in 2004, and Notre Dame associate head coach Brian O'Connor took over and made an immediate impact, with the program hosting its first NCAA regional in his first season. The Cavaliers have made the NCAA tournament every year from 2004 to 2017, and again from 2021 to 2024. The Cavaliers have claimed two ACC regular season titles under Coach O'Connor and captured ACC tournament championships in 2009 and 2011.

Virginia hosted NCAA regionals again in 2006 and 2007, but did not advance until 2009. That year, the Cavaliers won the Irvine Regional, defeating San Diego State ace Stephen Strasburg in the process, and defeated Ole Miss in the Oxford Super Regional to advance to the program's first College World Series. The Cavaliers finished fifth, falling to eventual National Champion Louisiana State in their first game, eliminating #2 national seed Cal State Fullerton in their second game, and then bowing out in a 12-inning loss to Arkansas.

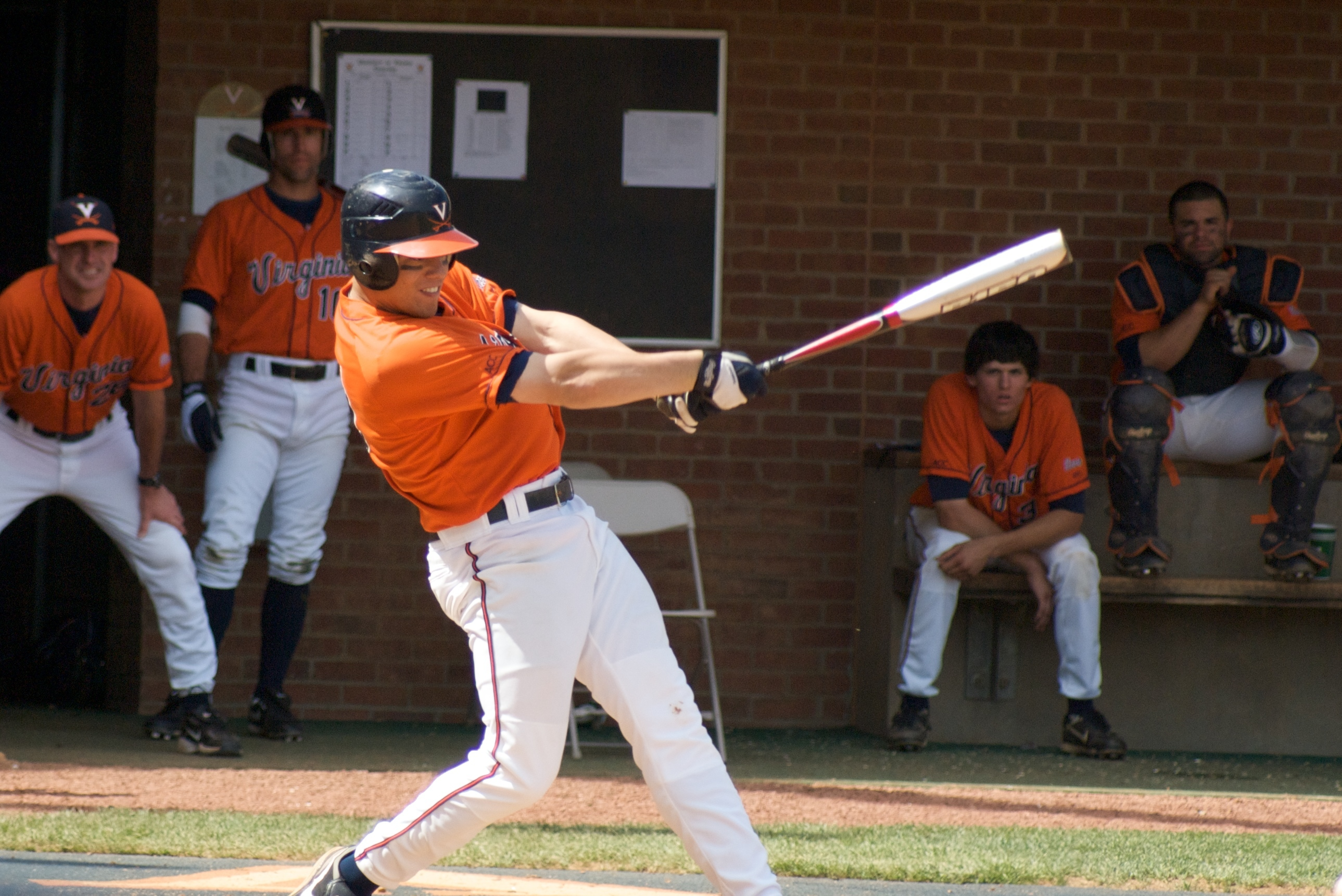
A Virginia batter swings during a game in 2009 as teammates look on

The Cavaliers won the Charlottesville Regional again in 2010, but fell to Oklahoma in the Charlottesville Super Regional. In 2011, entering the NCAA tournament as the top overall seed, they swept the Charlottesville Regional and rallied from a ninth-inning deficit to defeat UC Irvine on a two-run single from Chris Taylor in the Charlottesville Super Regional's decisive game three. They finished third in the College World Series, defeating California twice before twice losing to eventual champion South Carolina, with the elimination loss coming in 13 innings. The 2011 season also witnessed the only perfect game in Virginia baseball history, an accomplishment achieved by UVA pitcher Will Roberts during a March 30 win over George Washington. In 2013, Virginia swept the Charlottesville Regional before losing to Mississippi State in the Charlottesville Super Regional.

During an impressive 2014 campaign, the Cavaliers finished 53-16 and were rewarded with the #3 National Seed. After sweeping past Arkansas and Bucknell in the Charlottesville Regional and defeating border rival Maryland in the Charlottesville Super Regional, the Cavaliers returned to the College World Series for the first time in three seasons. They swept their side of the bracket, defeating Ole Miss (twice) and TCU to advance to the CWS Finals for the first time in school history. After splitting the first two games, UVA fell to Vanderbilt 3–2 in a decisive Game 3 of the College World Series finals, ending the most successful season in school history up to that point.

=== 2015 NCAA Champions ===
In 2015, an injury-riddled Virginia team slumped in the regular season and needed a series win in the final regular-season series at North Carolina to sew up a bid in the ACC tournament. They made the NCAA tournament as a No. 3 seed and swept through the Lake Elsinore Regional, defeating Southern California (twice) and San Diego State. They hosted Maryland in the Charlottesville Super Regional and clinched a trip to the College World Series on Ernie Clement's two-run single in the bottom of the ninth of the second game.

In Omaha, Virginia defeated Arkansas and Florida (twice) to set up a finals rematch with Vanderbilt. The Commodores won the first game 5–1 before the Cavaliers evened the series with a 3–0 victory behind five innings from surprise starter Adam Haseley and four from Josh Sborz. Virginia fell behind early in the decisive third game, giving up two runs in the first inning, but Pavin Smith homered to pull the Cavaliers even and singled to score Haseley with the eventual winning run. Brandon Waddell threw seven strong innings, aided by an acrobatic, run-saving stop from third baseman Kenny Towns, as the Cavaliers won 4–2 to capture the program's first national championship and the first for an ACC program since Wake Forest in 1955.

=== Lean Years and Return to Omaha ===
The 2015 National Champions followed that title up with another strong campaign in 2016, finishing 38–20 overall and 19–11 in the ACC. The Cavaliers were rewarded with the #12 national seed in the 2016 NCAA tournament and hosted the Charlottesville Regional, but were eliminated in three games. The Cavaliers followed up 2016 with another successful campaign in 2017, finishing 43–16 overall and 18–12 in the ACC. Despite the strong record, Virginia was denied the chance to host a regional, being sent to the TCU-hosted Fort Worth regional, falling in three games.

The 2018 Virginia baseball team finished 29–25 overall, 12–18 in conference play, missing the NCAA tournament for the first time since the 2003 season. The team was slightly improved in 2019, finishing 32–24, 14–16 in conference, but once again missed the NCAA tournament. The 2020 team got off to a hot start, beginning the season with a 14–4 record and upsetting #8 in NC State in the ACC-opening series. On March 12, 2020, due to the COVID-19 pandemic, Virginia and the ACC announced the season will be suspended until further notice. On March 17, 2020, the Atlantic Coast Conference announced all spring sports would be canceled for the remainder of the season.

The Cavaliers returned to the Diamond and the NCAA tournament, finishing 36–27 overall, 18–18 in the ACC. They were rewarded with the 3-seed in the Columbia Regional. After falling to 2-seed and host South Carolina (Regional 1-seed Old Dominion was unable to host due to COVID-19 protocol), Virginia rallied to defeat Jacksonville, South Carolina, and Old Dominion twice to advance to the Super Regionals. During this regional, Cavalier closer Stephen Schoch would go viral for his remarks during a post-game interview, being positively compared to fictional pitcher Kenny Powers. The Cavaliers faced Dallas Baptist in the Columbia Super Regional, defeating the Patriots in three games to advance to the CWS for the first time since their 2015 title. The Cavaliers defeated #3 National seed Tennessee before falling to #7 seed and eventual National Champion Mississippi State and #2 seed Texas, ending an impressive postseason run.

Virginia finished 39–19 (17–13 ACC) in 2022, being rewarded with the 2-seed in the East Carolina-hosted Greenville Regional. After defeating Coastal Carolina in their first game, UVA lost consecutive games to ECU and CCU to end their season.

Virginia responded with a stellar season in 2023, finishing the regular season with a 45–12 record, 19–11 in the ACC, and catcher Kyle Teel won the ACC Player of the Year award, becoming the first Cavalier to do so since Sean Doolittle in 2006. Virginia received the #7 National Seed and defeat Army and East Carolina twice to win the Charlottesville Regional. They defeated Duke 2 games to 1 in the Charlottesville Super Regional to reach the College World Series. However, their run ended there as they lost to Florida and TCU to end their season with a 50–15 record.

2024 proved to be another great season for the Cavaliers as they finished the season with a 40–14 overall record, finishing 2nd in the ACC Coastal Division. Griff O'Ferrall won the Brooks Wallace Award as the nation's top shortstop, the Rawling's Gold Glove award, and was named a second team All-American by ABCA. Henry Godbout, Jacob Ference, Casey Saucke, and Henry Ford all claimed various All-American honors as well. Virginia was awarded the #12 seed in the NCAA tournament and defeated Pennsylvania and Mississippi State twice to claim the Charlottesville Regional Championship. The Cavaliers then swept Kansas State in the Charlottesville Super Regional to advance to the College World Series for the third time in four seasons. Virginia fell to conference rivals North Carolina and Florida State in Omaha, finishing the season with a 46–17 overall record.

=== Chris Pollard Era ===
On June 10, 2025, Virginia hired former Duke Head Coach Chris Pollard to replace Brian O'Connor.

== Virginia in the NCAA tournament ==
The NCAA Division I baseball tournament started in 1947. The Cavaliers have played in 22 tournaments and advanced to the College World Series in 2009, 2011, 2014, 2015, 2021, 2023, and 2024, finishing as the runners-up to Vanderbilt in 2014 and defeating the Commodores in 2015 to win the championship.

| Year | Record | Pct | Notes |
|---|---|---|---|
| 1972 | 2–2 | .500 | District 3 |
| 1985 | 1–2 | .333 | Atlantic Regional |
| 1996 | 3–2 | .600 | South I Regional |
| 2004 | 2–2 | .500 | Hosted Charlottesville Regional |
| 2005 | 0–2 | .000 | Corvallis Regional |
| 2006 | 1–2 | .333 | Hosted Charlottesville Regional |
| 2007 | 2–2 | .500 | Hosted Charlottesville Regional |
| 2008 | 1–2 | .333 | Fullerton Regional |
| 2009 | 6–3 | .667 | College World Series 5th Place |
| 2010 | 4–3 | .571 | Hosted Charlottesville Regional and Super Regional |
| 2011 | 7–3 | .700 | College World Series 3rd Place, hosted Charlottesville Regional and Super Regional |
| 2012 | 1–2 | .333 | Hosted Charlottesville Regional |
| 2013 | 3–2 | .600 | Hosted Charlottesville Regional and Super Regional |
| 2014 | 9–3 | .750 | College World Series 2nd Place, hosted Charlottesville Regional and Super Regional |
| 2015 | 10–2 | .833 | College World Series Champion, hosted Charlottesville Super Regional |
| 2016 | 1–2 | .333 | Hosted Charlottesville Regional |
| 2017 | 1–2 | .333 | Fort Worth Regional |
| 2021 | 7–4 | .636 | College World Series 5th Place |
| 2022 | 1–2 | .333 | Greenville Regional |
| 2023 | 5–3 | .625 | College World Series 7th Place, hosted Charlottesville Regional and Super Regional |
| 2024 | 5–2 | .714 | College World Series 7th Place, hosted Charlottesville Regional and Super Regional |
| 2026 | 1–2 | .333 | Hattiesburg Regional |
| TOTALS | 73–51 | .589 | |

== Notable former players ==
=== Active Major League Baseball (MLB) players ===
- Ernie Clement, 2B/3B/OF, Toronto Blue Jays
- Zack Gelof (born 1999), 2B, Oakland A's
- Adam Haseley, OF, Philadelphia Phillies
- John Hicks, C, Texas Rangers
- Artie Lewicki, RHP, free agent
- Daniel Lynch, LHP, Kansas City Royals
- Jake McCarthy, OF, Arizona Diamondbacks
- Josh Sborz, RHP, Texas Rangers
- Pavin Smith, 1B/OF, Arizona Diamondbacks
- Chris Taylor, SS, Los Angeles Dodgers
- Matt Thaiss, 1B/3B, Los Angeles Angels
- Brandon Waddell, LHP, St. Louis Cardinals

=== Notable former MLB players ===
- Alec Bettinger, RHP, Milwaukee Brewers
- Kyle Crockett, LHP, Cleveland Indians, Cincinnati Reds
- Mike Cubbage, 3B, Texas Rangers, Minnesota Twins, New York Mets
- Derek Fisher, OF, Houston Astros, Toronto Blue Jays, Milwaukee Brewers
- Hank Foiles, C, Cincinnati Reds, Cleveland Indians, Pittsburgh Pirates, Kansas City Athletics, Detroit Tigers, Baltimore Orioles, Los Angeles Angels
- Phil Gosselin, 2B, Atlanta Braves, Arizona Diamondbacks, Pittsburgh Pirates, Texas Rangers, Cincinnati Reds, Philadelphia Phillies, Los Angeles Angels
- Brandon Guyer, OF, Tampa Bay Rays, Cleveland Indians
- Ricky Horton, LHP, St. Louis Cardinals, Chicago White Sox, Los Angeles Dodgers
- Javier López, LHP, San Francisco Giants
- Jarrett Parker, OF, San Francisco Giants, Los Angeles Angels
- Mark Reynolds, 1B, Arizona Diamondbacks, Baltimore Orioles, Cleveland Indians, New York Yankees, Milwaukee Brewers, St. Louis Cardinals, Colorado Rockies, Washington Nationals
- Eppa Rixey, LHP, Philadelphia Phillies, Cincinnati Reds, 1963 Hall of Fame inductee
- Michael Schwimer, RHP, Philadelphia Phillies
- Monte Weaver, RHP, Washington Senators, Boston Red Sox
- Tyler Wilson, RHP, Baltimore Orioles
- Ryan Zimmerman, 1B/3B, Washington Nationals
- Sean Doolittle, LHP, Oakland Athletics, Cincinnati Reds, Seattle Mariners, Washington Nationals

=== First-Round MLB Draft Picks ===
- Brian Buchanan, OF, New York Yankees, 1994
- Seth Greisinger, RHP, Detroit Tigers, 1996
- Ryan Zimmerman, 3B, Washington Nationals, 2005
- Sean Doolittle, 1B/LHP, Oakland Athletics, 2007
- Danny Hultzen, LHP, Seattle Mariners, 2011
- Nick Howard, RHP, Cincinnati Reds, 2014
- Derek Fisher, OF, Houston Astros, 2014
- Mike Papi, OF, Cleveland Indians, 2014
- Nathan Kirby, LHP, Milwaukee Brewers, 2015
- Matt Thaiss, C, Los Angeles Angels, 2016
- Pavin Smith, 1B, Arizona Diamondbacks, 2017
- Adam Haseley, OF, Philadelphia Phillies, 2017
- Daniel Lynch, LHP, Kansas City Royals, 2018
- Jake McCarthy, OF, Arizona Diamondbacks, 2018
- Kyle Teel, C, Boston Red Sox, 2023
- AJ Gracia, OF, Atlanta Braves, 2026

(Includes supplemental and competitive-balance picks)

== Honors ==
=== First-Team All-Americans ===
- 1977: Jimmy Blankenship, P (BA)
- 1978: Jimmy Blankenship, P (BA)
- 1979: Jimmy Blankenship, P (BA)
- 1994: Brian Buchanan, OF (BA)
- 1996: Seth Greisinger, RHP (ABCA, BA, CB)
- 2007: Jacob Thompson, RHP (ABCA, BA, CB)
- 2009: Danny Hultzen, UTIL (ABCA)
- 2010: Kevin Arico, RHP (NCBWA, CB)
- 2010: Danny Hultzen, LHP (ABCA, CB, NCBWA)
- 2011: Danny Hultzen, UTIL (BA, CB), LHP (ABCA)
- 2013: Mike Papi, OF (ABCA, BA)
- 2014: Nathan Kirby, LHP (ABCA, BA, CB)
- 2016: Connor Jones, RHP (ABCA)
- 2017: Adam Haseley, OF (ABCA, BA)
- 2023: Connelly Early, LHP (NCBWA)
- 2023: Kyle Teel, C (Consensus)

=== National Coach of the Year ===
- 2006: Brian O'Connor (CBF)
- 2009: Brian O'Connor (NCBWA, CBI)
- 2015: Brian O'Connor (CB, PG, BA)

Legend:

- ABCA = American Baseball Coaches Association
- BA = Baseball America
- CB = Collegiate Baseball/Louisville Slugger
- CBF = College Baseball Foundation
- CBI = CollegeBaseballInsider.com
- NCBWA = National College Baseball Writers Association
- PG = Perfect Game

=== College World Series All-Tournament Team ===
- 2009

Tyler Cannon, SS

- 2014

Branden Cogswell, 2B
Brandon Downes, OF
Nate Irving, C
Artie Lewicki, P
Brandon Waddell, P

- 2015

Ernie Clement, 2B
Daniel Pinero, SS
Kenny Towns, 3B
Josh Sborz, P
Brandon Waddell, P

- 2021

Zack Gelof, 3B

=== College World Series Most Outstanding Player ===
- 2015: Josh Sborz, P

=== Buster Posey National Collegiate Catcher of the Year ===
- 2023: Kyle Teel

=== Brooks Wallace Award for Nation's Top Shortstop ===
- 2024: Griff O'Ferrall

=== Rawling's Gold Glove Award ===
- 2010: Jarrett Parker, OF
- 2013: Ethan O'Donnell, CF
- 2024: Griff O'Ferrall, SS

=== ACC Player of the Year ===
- 1977: Jimmy Blankenship, P/SS
- 1978: Jimmy Blankenship, P/SS
- 2004: Joe Koshansky, P/1B
- 2006: Sean Doolittle, P/1B
- 2023: Kyle Teel, C

=== ACC Pitcher of the Year ===
- 1977: Jimmy Blankenship
- 1978: Jimmy Blankenship
- 2010: Danny Hultzen
- 2011: Danny Hultzen
- 2014: Nathan Kirby (co-winner)

=== ACC Coach of the Year ===
- 1987: Dennis Womack
- 2004: Brian O'Connor
- 2010: Brian O'Connor
- 2011: Brian O'Connor
- 2013: Brian O'Connor
- 2014: Brian O'Connor

== Head coaches ==
- Unknown (1889–1909) 288–167–9 (Duffy may have been coach during this period)
- Charles Rigler (1910–12) 32–32–2
- Jack Ryan (1913–1916, 1922) 60–43–1
- James L. White (1917, 1920) 13–9–1
- Henry Lannigan (1918) 7–4–0
- E. W. Smith (1919) 8–8–1
- W. Rice Warren (1921) 7–15–0
- Earle "Greasy" Neale (1923–28) 80–73–2
- Howard Holland (1929)
- Roy Randall (1930) 2–12–0
- Gus Tebell (1931–42, 1944–55) 266–189–9
- Art Corcoran (1943) 6–5–1
- Evan "Bus" Male (1956–59) 36–50–0
- Ted Davenport (1960–61) 10–26–2
- James West (1962–80) 281–276–5
- Dennis Womack (1981–2003) 594–605–7
- Brian O'Connor (2004–2025) 885–368–2
- Chris Pollard (2025–present)

When West died on May 24, 2009, the Cavaliers added a black circle with the number "24" above the team name on their uniforms for the rest of the season. West had worn that number when he was coach.

== See also ==
- List of NCAA Division I baseball programs
