= 1908–09 University of Virginia men's basketball team =

American college basketball season

1908–09 University of Virginia men's basketball
- Conference: South Atlantic Intercollegiate Athletic Association
- Record: 6–3 (2–2 SAIAA)
- Head coach: Henry Lannigan (4th season)
- Home arena: Fayerweather Gymnasium

The 1908–09 University of Virginia men's basketball team represented the University of Virginia during the 1908–09 IAAUS men's basketball season. The team was led by fourth-year head coach Henry Lannigan, and played their home games at Fayerweather Gymnasium in Charlottesville, Virginia. Now known as the Virginia Cavaliers, the team did not have an official nickname prior to 1923.

== Schedule ==
Date time, TV	Opponent	Result	Record	Site city, state
Regular season
January 10 no, no	William & Mary	W 25–19	1–0 (1–0)	Fayerweather Gymnasium; Charlottesville, VA
* no, no	at Washington & Lee	L 14–28	1–1 (1–0)	Lexington, VA
* no, no	at VMI	W 22–12	2–1 (1–0)	Lexington, VA
January 30 no, no	Georgetown	L 24–35	2–2 (1–1)	Fayerweather Gymnasium; Charlottesville, VA
February 2* no, no	Washington & Lee	W 23–8	3–2 (1–1)	Fayerweather Gymnasium; Charlottesville, VA
February 15 no, no	vs. William & Mary	W 32–28	4–2 (2–1)	Richmond, VA
February 16* no, no	vs. Randolph-Macon	W 35–14	5–2 (2–1)	Richmond, VA
February 24* no, no	VMI	W 24–18	6–2 (2–1)	Fayerweather Gymnasium; Charlottesville, VA
February 27 no, no	Georgetown	L 25–45	6–3 (2–2)	Fayerweather Gymnasium; Charlottesville, VA
*Non-conference game. (#) Tournament seedings in parentheses. All times are in Eastern Time.
