= 2013 18U Baseball World Cup =

Tournament details
- Country: Taiwan
- Dates: August 30 - September 8
- Teams: 12
- Defending champions: United States

Final positions
- Champions: United States (7th title)
- Runners-up: Japan
- Third place: Cuba
- Fourth place: Chinese Taipei

Tournament statistics
- Best BA: (United States) Adam Haseley (.484)
- Most HRs: (Canada) Gareth Morgan (2)
- Most SBs: (Japan) Takahiro Kumagai (Canada) Malik Collymore (South Korea) Tae Jin Kim (5)
- Most Ks (as pitcher): (Japan) Yuki Matsui (Japan) Tomohiro Anraku (27)

The 2013 18U Baseball World Cup was an international baseball competition held in Taichung and Yunlin (Douliu), Taiwan from August 30 to September 8, 2013. There were no games played on August 30 and August 31, due to rain.

== Medalists ==
Event	Gold	Silver	Bronze
Tournament	United States; Brady Aiken; Bryson Brigman; Joe DeMers; Alex Destino; Jack Flaherty; Marvin Gorgas; Adam Haseley; Scott Hurst; Kel Johnson; Trace Loehr; Mac Marshall; Keaton McKinney; Jacob Nix; Luis Ortiz; Jakson Reetz; Mike Rivera; J. J. Schwarz; Justus Sheffield; Lane Thomas; Cole Tucker	Japan; Tomohiro Anraku; Harumi Iida; Yusei Itsuzaki; Akihito Iwashige; Takahiro Kumagai; Yuki Matsui; Tomoya Mori; Ryuma Mori; Nobuyuki Okumura; Satoshi Sonobe; Kazuto Taguchi; Yuya Takahashi; Kona Takahashi; Haruki Takemura; Yasuhito Uchida; Seiji Uebayashi; Kenya Wakatsuki; Ryo Watanabe; Taisuke Yamaoka; Yuto Yoshida	Cuba; Randy Arozarena; Yoandri Caro; Aldo Conrado; Yusniel Diaz; Ariel Díaz; Yadier Hechavarría; Moisés Esquerres; Vladimir Gutiérrez; Rubén Hernández; Yunior Ibarra; J. P. Martínez; Víctor Víctor Mesa; Mario Miranda; Yoán Moncada; Noel Ortíz; Yanio Perez; Arbelio Quiróz; Orlando Roas; Luis Robert; Alexquemer Sanchez

== Teams ==
The following 12 teams qualified for the tournament.

Pool A	Pool B
Canada	Australia
Chinese Taipei^{1}	Colombia
Czech Republic	Cuba
Japan	Italy
Mexico	South Korea
Venezuela	United States

^1 Chinese Taipei is the official IBAF designation for the team representing the state officially referred to as the Republic of China, more commonly known as Taiwan. (See also political status of Taiwan for details.)

== Round 1 ==
=== Group A ===
Pos	Team	Pld	W	L	RF	RA	PCT	GB	Qualification
1	Japan (H)	5	5	0	44	6	1.000	—	Advance to round 2
2	Chinese Taipei	5	4	1	48	11	.800	1	Advance to round 2
3	Venezuela	5	3	2	19	29	.600	2	Advance to round 2
4	Canada	5	2	3	39	25	.400	3	
5	Mexico	5	1	4	26	47	.200	4	
6	Czech Republic	5	0	5	7	65	.000	5	

Source: WBSC
(H) Hosts

Date	Local time	Road team	Score	Home team	Inn.	Venue	Game duration	Attendance	Boxscore
Sep 1, 2013	12:30	Canada	16 – 3	Czech Republic		Douliou Baseball Stadium	2:35	500	Boxscore
Sep 1, 2013	12:30	Japan	4 – 1	Chinese Taipei		Taichung Intercontinental Baseball Stadium	3:29	5,000	Boxscore
Sep 1, 2013	18:30	Mexico	5 – 6	Venezuela		Taichung Baseball Field	3:49	250	Boxscore
Sep 2, 2013	10:00	Japan	11 – 0	Mexico	F/7	Douliou Baseball Stadium	2:27	300	Boxscore
Sep 2, 2013	10:30	Venezuela	7 – 5	Canada		Taichung Baseball Field	3:16	250	Boxscore
Sep 2, 2013	10:30	Chinese Taipei	16 – 0	Czech Republic	F/5	Taichung Intercontinental Baseball Stadium	1:43	1,000	Boxscore
Sep 2, 2013	18:00	Venezuela	0 – 7	Japan		Douliou Baseball Stadium	2:41	500	Boxscore
Sep 2, 2013	18:30	Czech Republic	2 – 12	Mexico	F/7	Taichung Baseball Field	2:57	250	Boxscore
Sep 2, 2013	18:30	Chinese Taipei	4 – 2	Canada		Taichung Intercontinental Baseball Stadium	2:58	1,000	Boxscore
Sep 3, 2013	14:30	Mexico	4 – 11	Canada		Douliou Baseball Stadium	2:51	260	Boxscore
Sep 3, 2013	14:30	Czech Republic	0 – 15	Japan	F/6	Taichung Baseball Field	1:41	100	Boxscore
Sep 3, 2013	17:30	Venezuela	0 – 10	Chinese Taipei	F/7	Taichung Intercontinental Baseball Stadium	2:42	3,217	Boxscore
Sep 4, 2013	12:30	Czech Republic	2 – 6	Venezuela		Douliou Baseball Stadium	2:27	250	Boxscore
Sep 4, 2013	12:30	Canada	5 – 7	Japan		Taichung Baseball Field	2:30	250	Boxscore
Sep 4, 2013	18:30	Mexico	5 – 17	Chinese Taipei		Taichung Intercontinental Baseball Stadium	3:05	400	Boxscore

=== Group B ===
Pos	Team	Pld	W	L	RF	RA	PCT	GB	Qualification
1	United States	5	4	1	28	13	.800 (Note: Head-to-head result: Cuba 5–6 United States)	—	Advance to round 2
2	Cuba	5	4	1	35	9	.800	—	Advance to round 2
3	South Korea	5	3	2	27	8	.600	1	Advance to round 2
4	Australia	5	2	3	16	18	.400	2	
5	Colombia	5	1	4	16	39	.200 (Note: Head-to-head result: Italy 4–6 Colombia)	3	
6	Italy	5	1	4	15	50	.200	3	

Source: WBSC
Notes:

Date	Local time	Road team	Score	Home team	Inn.	Venue	Game duration	Attendance	Boxscore
Sep 1, 2013	13:30	Australia	9 – 4	Colombia		Taichung Baseball Field	2:57	250	Boxscore
Sep 1, 2013	18:30	Italy	0 – 8	United States		Douliou Baseball Stadium	2:52	800	Boxscore
Sep 1, 2013	18:30	Cuba	2 – 1	South Korea		Taichung Intercontinental Baseball Stadium	3:39	300	Boxscore
Sep 2, 2013	14:00	Colombia	0 – 4	South Korea		Douliou Baseball Stadium	2:56	400	Boxscore
Sep 2, 2013	14:30	Italy	0 – 15	Cuba	F/6	Taichung Baseball Field	1:55	250	Boxscore
Sep 2, 2013	14:30	Australia	1 – 0	United States		Taichung Intercontinental Baseball Stadium	2:43	250	Boxscore
Sep 3, 2013	10:30	United States	2 – 1	South Korea		Taichung Baseball Field	3:02	250	Boxscore
Sep 3, 2013	10:30	Australia	4 – 7	Italy		Douliou Baseball Stadium	2:50	250	Boxscore
Sep 3, 2013	10:30	Colombia	0 – 10	Cuba	F/7	Taichung Intercontinental Baseball Stadium	2:15	250	Boxscore
Sep 3, 2013	18:30	Australia	0 – 4	South Korea		Taichung Baseball Field	3:01	250	Boxscore
Sep 3, 2013	18:30	Italy	4 – 6	Colombia		Douliou Baseball Stadium	3:16	400	Boxscore
Sep 3, 2013	21:30	Cuba	5 – 6	United States		Taichung Intercontinental Baseball Stadium	3:21	2,147	Boxscore
Sep 4, 2013	12:30	South Korea	17 – 4	Italy	F/8	Taichung Intercontinental Baseball Stadium	3:19	200	Boxscore
Sep 4, 2013	18:30	Cuba	3 – 2	Australia		Douliou Baseball Stadium	3:02	1,005	Boxscore
Sep 4, 2013	18:30	United States	12 – 6	Colombia		Taichung Baseball Field	3:11	250	Boxscore

== Round 2 ==
Pos	Team	Pld	W	L	RF	RA	PCT	GB	Qualification
1	United States	5	5	0	40	20	1.000	—	Advance to final
2	Japan (H)	5	4	1	35	11	.800	1	Advance to final
3	Cuba	5	3	2	16	23	.600	2	Advance to 3rd place game
4	Chinese Taipei	5	2	3	21	16	.400	3	Advance to 3rd place game
5	South Korea	5	1	4	17	20	.200	4	Advance to 5th place game
6	Venezuela	5	0	5	12	51	.000	5	Advance to 5th place game

Source: WBSC
(H) Hosts

== 5th place game ==
Team	1	2	3	4	5	6	7	8	9	R	H	E
Venezuela	0	0	0	0	0	0	1	0	0	1	6	1
South Korea	1	0	0	2	0	2	1	0	X	6	7	3

== 3rd place game ==
Team	1	2	3	4	5	6	7	8	9	R	H	E
Chinese Taipei	0	1	0	0	0	0	0	0	0	1	4	1
Cuba	3	1	0	2	0	0	0	0	X	6	11	1

== Final ==
Team	1	2	3	4	5	6	7	8	9	R	H	E
Japan	0	0	0	0	1	0	0	1	0	2	6	1
United States	0	0	0	0	1	1	1	0	X	3	6	1

== Final standings ==
Rk	Team
1st place, gold medalist(s)	United States
Lost in final
2nd place, silver medalist(s)	Japan
Failed to qualify for the final
3rd place, bronze medalist(s)	Cuba
Lost in 3rd place game
4	Chinese Taipei
Failed to qualify for the finals
5	South Korea
6	Venezuela
Failed to qualify for the round 2
7	Canada
8	Australia
9	Mexico
10	Colombia
11	Italy
12	Czech Republic

== Awards ==
Awards	Player
Most Valuable Player	(United States) Luis Ortiz
Outstanding Defensive Player	(Cuba) Moises Esquerre

All-Tournament Team
Position	Player
Starting Pitcher	(Japan) Tomohiro Anraku
Relief Pitcher	(Japan) Taisuke Yamaoka
Catcher	(Japan) Tomoya Mori
First Base	(South Korea) Byeong-wuk Lim
Second Base	(Chinese Taipei) Li Lin
Third Base	(United States) Mike Rivera
Shortstop	(Japan) Taiga Hirasawa
Outfield	(United States) Adam Haseley
Outfield	(Chinese Taipei) Tzu-Hao Chen
Outfield	(Canada) Tyler O'Neill
Designated Hitter	(Chinese Taipei) Cheng-Tang Wang

== See also ==
- List of sporting events in Taiwan
