= 1906–07 University of Virginia men's basketball team =

American college basketball season

1906–07 University of Virginia men's basketball
- Conference: Independent
- Record: 5–3
- Head coach: Henry Lannigan (2nd season)
- Home arena: Fayerweather Gymnasium

The 1906–07 University of Virginia men's basketball team represented the University of Virginia during the 1906–07 IAAUS men's basketball season. The team was led by second-year head coach Henry Lannigan, and played their home games at Fayerweather Gymnasium in Charlottesville, Virginia. Now known as the Virginia Cavaliers, the team did not have an official nickname prior to 1923.

== Schedule ==
Date time, TV	Opponent	Result	Record	Site city, state
Regular season
December 4* no, no	Charlottesville YMCA	W 36–16	1–0	Fayerweather Gymnasium; Charlottesville, VA
January 19* no, no	at Washington & Lee	W 19–15	2–0	Lexington, VA
January 26* no, no	George Washington	W 18–17	3–0	Fayerweather Gymnasium; Charlottesville, VA
February 2* no, no	at Staunton Military Academy	W 16–13	4–0	Staunton, VA
February 2* no, no	at Staunton YMCA	L 25–45	4–1	Staunton, VA
February 7* no, no	at George Washington	L 23–26	4–2	Washington, DC
February 9* no, no	at Georgetown	L 11–22	4–3	Washington Light Infantry Armory; Washington, DC
February 15* no, no	Washington & Lee	W 27–18	5–3	Fayerweather Gymnasium; Charlottesville, VA
*Non-conference game. (#) Tournament seedings in parentheses. All times are in Eastern Time.
