= Jeremy Jeffress =

American baseball player (born 1987)

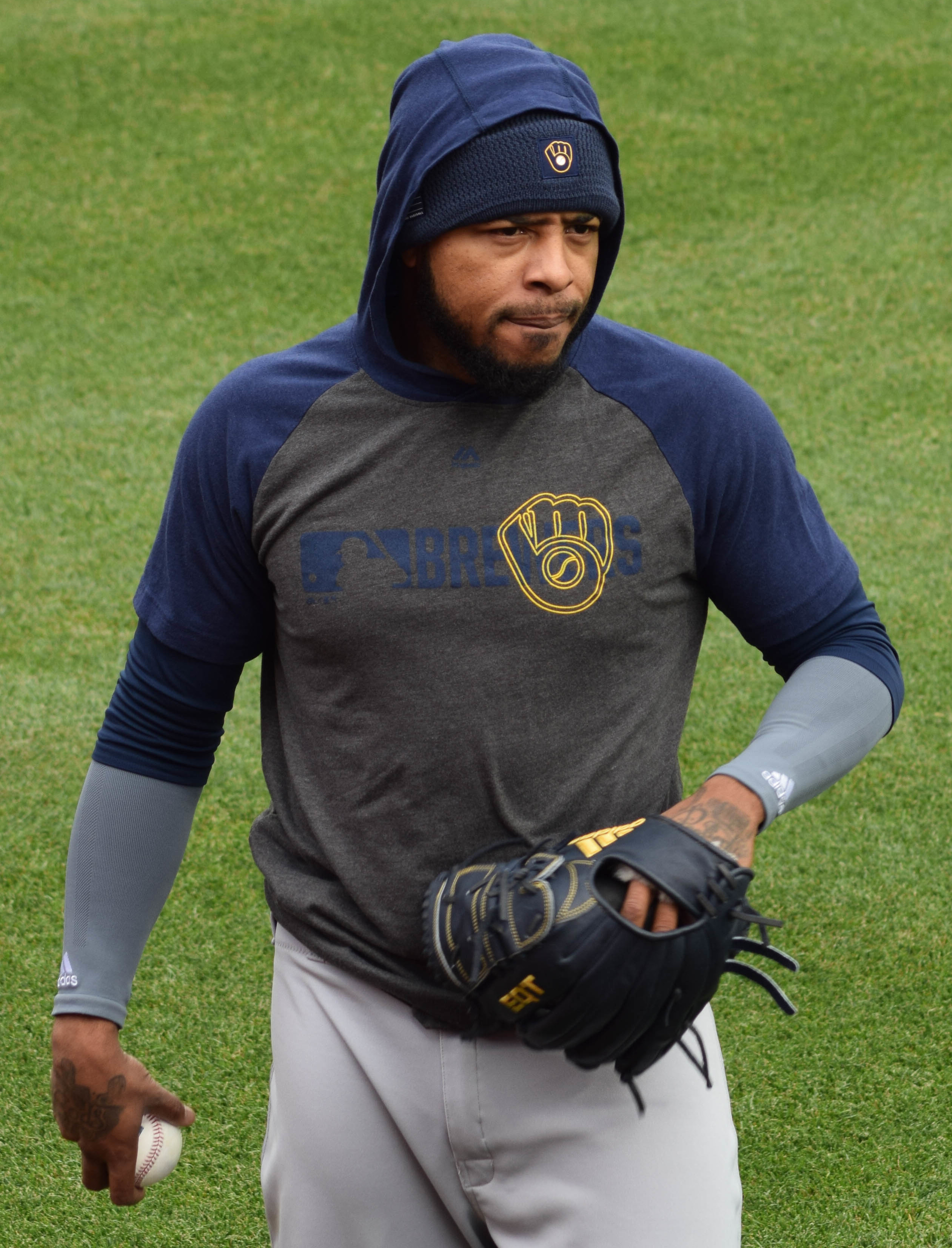
- Jeffress with the Milwaukee Brewers in 2019

Free agent
- Pitcher
- Born: September 21, 1987 (age 39); South Boston, Virginia, U.S.
- Bats: Right Throws: Right

MLB debut
- September 1, 2010, for the Milwaukee Brewers

MLB statistics (through 2020 season)
- Win–loss record: 32–12
- Earned run average: 3.08
- Strikeouts: 387
- Stats at Baseball Reference

Teams
- Milwaukee Brewers (2010); Kansas City Royals (2011–2012); Toronto Blue Jays (2013–2014); Milwaukee Brewers (2014–2016); Texas Rangers (2016–2017); Milwaukee Brewers (2017–2019); Chicago Cubs (2020)

Career highlights and awards
- All-Star (2018)

Jeremy Ross Jeffress (born September 21, 1987) is an American professional baseball pitcher who is a free agent. He has previously played in Major League Baseball (MLB) for the Kansas City Royals, Toronto Blue Jays, Texas Rangers, Milwaukee Brewers, and Chicago Cubs. Jeffress was an All-Star in 2018.

== Career ==
=== Milwaukee Brewers ===
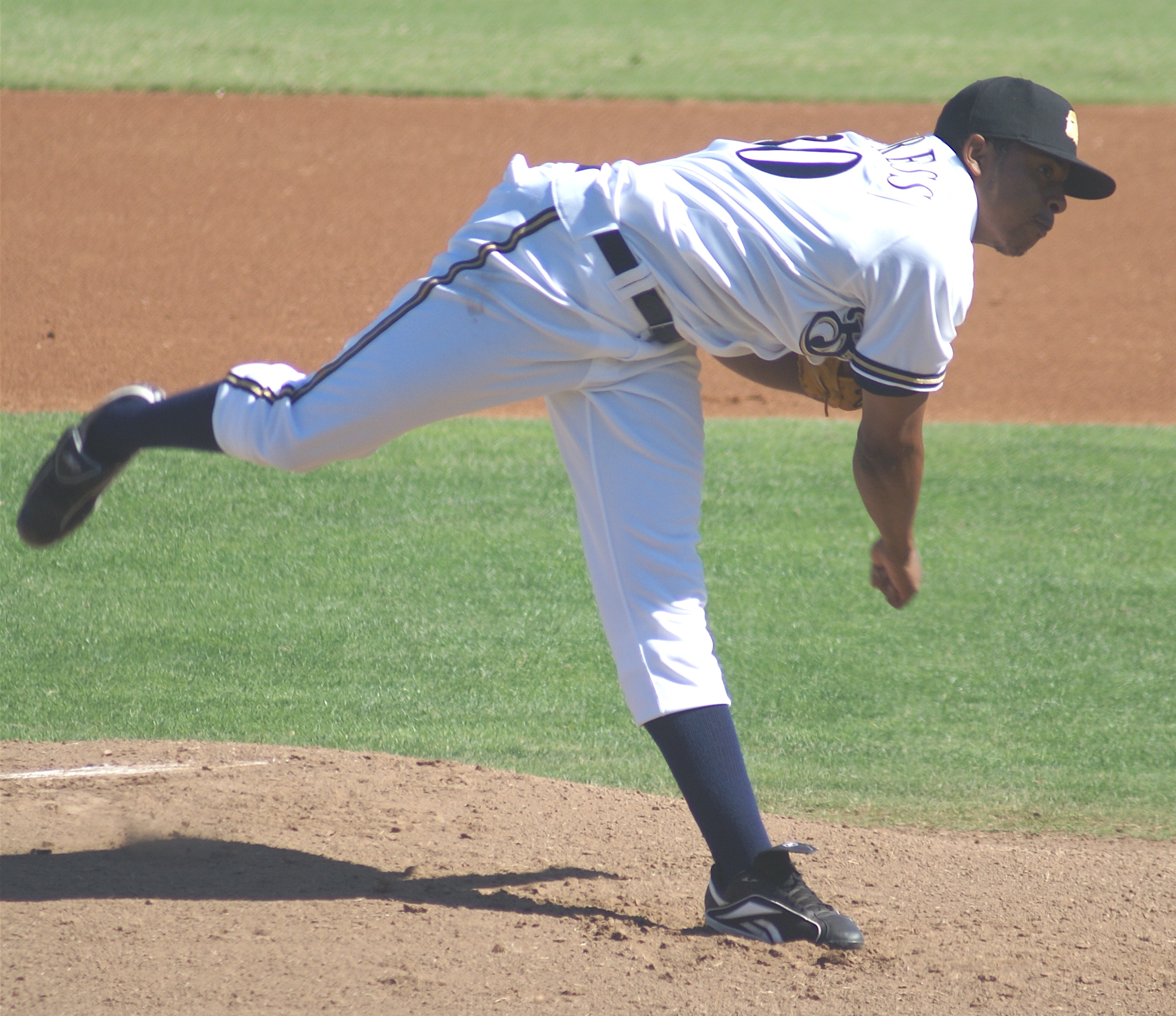
Jeffress pitching in Arizona Fall League in 2008

After graduating from Halifax County High School in South Boston, Virginia, Jeffress was selected by the Milwaukee Brewers as the 16th overall pick in the 2006 Major League Baseball draft. He signed a contract with a $1.55 million signing bonus in 2006.

In 2008, Jeffress started on the Brevard County Manatees' roster on the restricted list. On August 6, the Milwaukee Brewers organization announced that he was promoted to their Double-A team, the Huntsville Stars. Jeffress began the 2009 season with Huntsville, but struggled and was sent back to Brevard County in May 2009. At the beginning of the 2010 campaign, he was sent down to the Class A affiliate, the Wisconsin Timber Rattlers.

On July 1, 2010, Jeffress was called up to Class A-Advanced Brevard County, where he continued to throw out of the bullpen. Jeffress was later promoted to Huntsville. He was called up to the majors for the first time on September 1, 2010. Jeffress made his major league debut that evening, pitching one scoreless inning. On the year, Jeffress made 10 appearances, finishing with a 1–0 record with a 2.70 ERA in 10 innings with 10 strikeouts and 6 walks.

=== Kansas City Royals ===
On December 18, 2010, Jeffress was traded to the Kansas City Royals with Alcides Escobar, Lorenzo Cain, and Jake Odorizzi for Zack Greinke and Yuniesky Betancourt. In spring training in 2011, Jeffress led the major leagues in wild pitches, with five in 11 innings. Jeffress began the year on the Royals roster, and got his first win as a Royal on April 5 against the Chicago White Sox. He made 14 appearances with a 4.70 ERA in 15.1 innings of work, adding on 13 strikeouts, but also had 11 walks and 12 hits allowed. On May 21, Jeffress was optioned to the Omaha Storm Chasers, the Royals Triple-A affiliate, posting a 7.13 ERA in 16 games, 3 of which were starts. These struggles led him to be moved down to the Royals Double-A affiliate, the Northwest Arkansas Naturals on July 20, where he appeared in 9 games, starting 8, posting a 4.26 ERA in 31.2 innings, adding on 20 strikeouts as well as 22 walks and 32 hits allowed.

In the 2012 season, Jeffress split time between the Storm Chasers and Royals, as he was unable to find his footing in the majors posting a 6.75 ERA in just 13 appearances, allowing 19 hits, 14 runs and 14 walks to just 14 strikeouts in 13.1 innings. His play in the minors showed signs of improvement as he made 37 appearances, going 5–4 with 4.97 ERA, with 61 strikeouts to just 25 walks.

On November 2, 2012, the Royals designated Jeffress for assignment.

=== Toronto Blue Jays ===
On November 8, 2012, the Toronto Blue Jays received Jeffress from the Royals in exchange for cash considerations. Jeffress was designated for assignment by the Blue Jays on April 6, 2013, after pitching in one game. Jeffress cleared waivers, and was assigned outright to the Triple-A Buffalo Bisons on April 16. Jeffress was sent to the Class A Dunedin Blue Jays on April 25 without having pitched for the Bisons. He was brought up to the Bisons on May 3. His contract was selected by the Blue Jays on September 3 after the Bisons season ended, and the major league rosters expanded. He appeared in 10 games for the Blue Jays posting a 0.87 ERA in 10.1 innings, while in his time with the Bison he had a 1–0 record with a 1.65 ERA in 25 appearances.

Jeffress opened the 2014 season on the major league roster, where he struggled mightly after showing flashes the year prior. In just 3 appearances, Jeffress posted a 10.80 ERA in 3 innings of work. Jeffress was designated for assignment after the game on April 4, 2014. On April 15, after clearing waivers, Jeffress was assigned to Buffalo; however, he chose free agency rather than report to Buffalo.

=== Milwaukee Brewers (second stint) ===
Jeffress signed a minor league contract with the Milwaukee Brewers on April 18, 2014. He was assigned to the Triple-A Nashville Sounds. The Brewers selected the contract of Jeffress from Nashville on July 21, 2014. Jeffress thrived in his return to Milwaukee, emerging as a stellar setup-man to closer Francisco Rodriguez and posting a 1–1 record with a 1.88 ERA in 29 games.

In 2015, after struggles from setup man Jonathan Broxton, Jeffress took over as the eight-inning man for Milwaukee. He continued his success from last season in his new role, posting a 2.65 ERA in 68 innings, striking out 67 batters while walking just 22 in 72 appearances.

In 2016, Jeffress was slated to be Milwaukee's setup man to closer Will Smith but before spring training could begin, Jeffress was named closer when Smith suffered a knee injury. As the closer, Jeffress made 47 appearances, posting a 2.22 ERA with 27 saves (Tied for 4th in NL at the time) in 58 innings, striking out 35 batters while walking only 11.

=== Texas Rangers ===
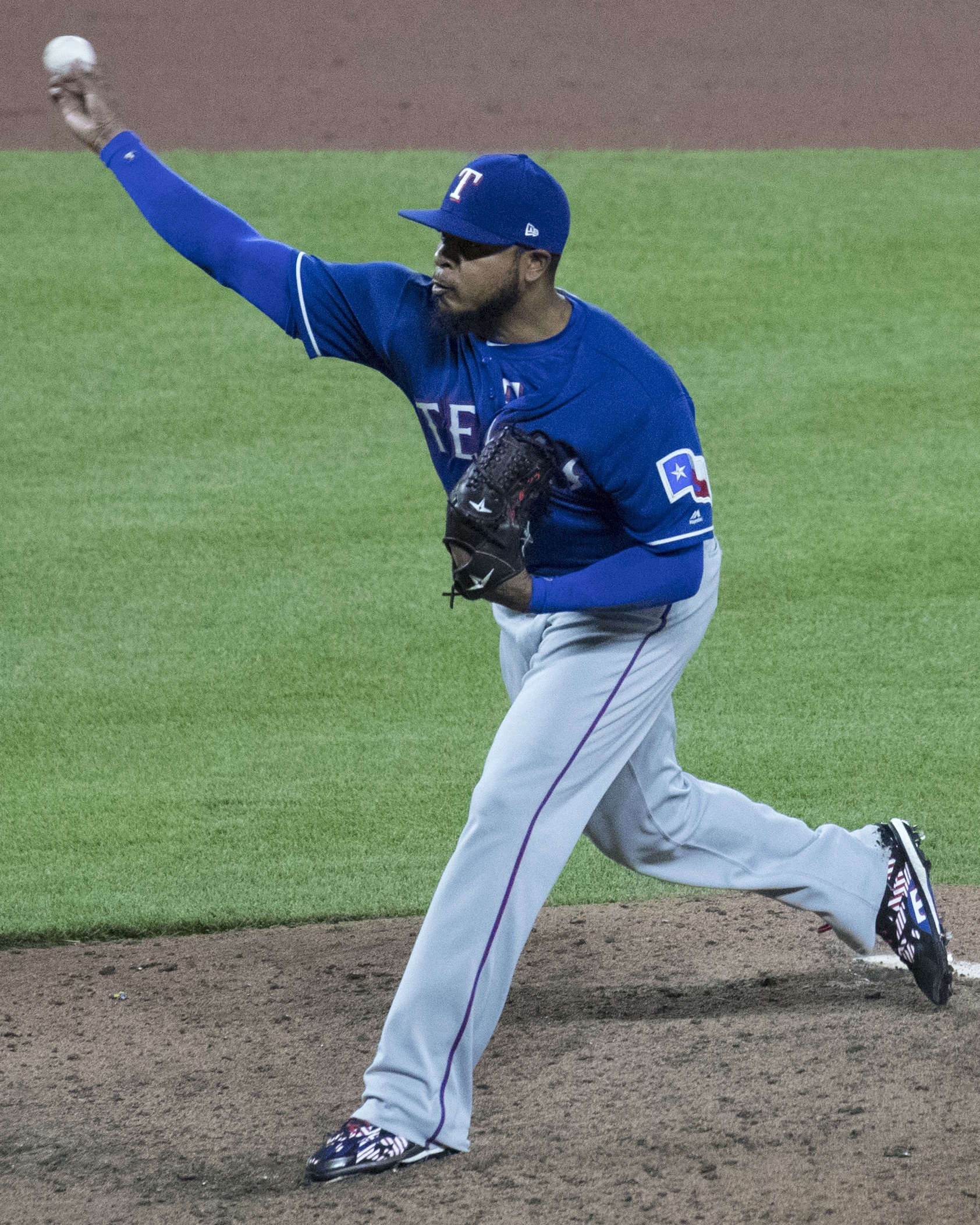
Jeffress with the Texas Rangers in 2017

On August 1, 2016, the Brewers traded Jeffress and Jonathan Lucroy to the Texas Rangers for Lewis Brinson, Luis Ortiz, and a player to be named later. He made 9 appearances following the trade, posting a 4.00 ERA in 9 innings, before being placed on the restricted list for a DUI. Jeffress would make 3 more appearances following his return, finishing the season with a 3–2 record with a 2.33 ERA in 58 innings with 27 saves, which was good enough for 7th in the National League despite only playing half the season there.

After a 2016 season on-par with his career statistics, Jeffress struggled with the Rangers in 2017. He posted a 5.31 ERA and a 1–2 record over 40.2 innings while with the Rangers that season.

=== Milwaukee Brewers (third stint) ===
On July 31, 2017, the Rangers traded Jeffress to the Milwaukee Brewers in exchange for Tayler Scott. He made 22 appearances following the trade posting a 4–0 record with a 3.65 ERA in 24.2 innings.

In 2018, Jeffress returned to his former setup man role, with Corey Knebel following him. Jeffress had a 0.99 ERA in 45.1 innings in the first half of the season, with fellow bullpen arm Josh Hader posting a 1.55 ERA in 46.1 innings, creating a dominant bullpen for the contending Brewers. On July 12, 2018, Jeffress was named to his first All-Star team as a replacement for Sean Doolittle. On the season, Jeffress appeared in 73 games, posting an 8–1 record with 1.29 ERA in 76.2 innings, as well as 15 saves. However, he struggled in the postseason, allowing 16 hits and six earned runs in eight innings of work for a 6.75 ERA. In the NLCS against the Los Angeles Dodgers, Jeffress made five appearances; he picked up two holds and closed out another win, but gave up key home runs in Game 2 and Game 7, each of which the Brewers lost as the Dodgers advanced to the World Series.

Jeffress began the 2019 season with the Brewers Triple-A affiliate, the San Antonio Missions, after suffering a shoulder injury in spring training. He made his season debut on April 17, pitching for 2/3 of an inning, striking out one batter. On August 25, Jeffress was placed on the 10-day injured list after suffering a hip injury, and was later released by the Brewers on September 1.

=== Chicago Cubs ===
On January 28, 2020, Jeffress was signed by the Chicago Cubs for a one-year, $850,000 major league contract, with the possibility he could earn an additional $200,000 based on games pitched. During the shortened 2020 season, Jeffress earned eight saves, recorded a 1.54 ERA, and held opposing hitters to a .137 batting average. He was one of the Cubs' three nominees for the 2020 All-MLB Team and was a finalist for the NL Reliever of the Year award. In the postseason he allowed two runs in 1.2 innings as the Cubs dropped two straight games to the Marlins in the Wild Card round and were eliminated.

=== Lexington Legends ===
On February 22, 2021, Jeffress signed a minor league contract with the Washington Nationals organization that included an invitation to spring training. On March 7, Jeffress was released by the Nationals, prior to the start of the season.

On July 7, 2021, Jeffress signed with the Lexington Legends of the Atlantic League of Professional Baseball. In 23 relief appearances, Jeffress posted a 1–1 record with a 6.45 ERA and 27 strikeouts. He was released by the team on September 12.

=== Diablos Rojos del México ===
On March 18, 2022, Jeffress signed with the Diablos Rojos del México of the Mexican League. In 17 relief appearances, Jeffress posted a 3–2 record with a 7.36 ERA and 17 strikeouts over 18 1/3 innings. He was released on June 11.

=== Tigres de Quintana Roo ===
On July 1, 2025, after three years of inactivity, Jeffress signed with the Tigres de Quintana Roo of the Mexican League. In two appearances for Quintana Roo, he allowed seven runs on five hits with no strikeouts over one inning of work. Jeffress was released by the Tigres on July 5.

== Personal life ==
On August 30, 2007, Jeffress was suspended for 50 games after testing positive for "a drug of abuse," which was reportedly marijuana. This was not his first positive test; he had been given a warning for his first offense. In June 2009, he tested positive a third time, and was suspended for 100 games. One more positive test will result in a lifetime ban for Jeffress.

In late June 2013 while with the Triple-A Buffalo Bisons, Jeffress was diagnosed with juvenile epilepsy, which gave an explanation to the high anxiety and seizures that he had experienced through most of his adult life. Before receiving a proper diagnosis, he self-medicated with marijuana.

On August 26, 2016, at 2:24 a.m. Jeffress was arrested for driving while intoxicated. In January 2018 Jeffress was sentenced to three days in jail/time served after pleading guilty to driving while intoxicated.
