= Jonathan Villar =

Dominican baseball player (born 1991)

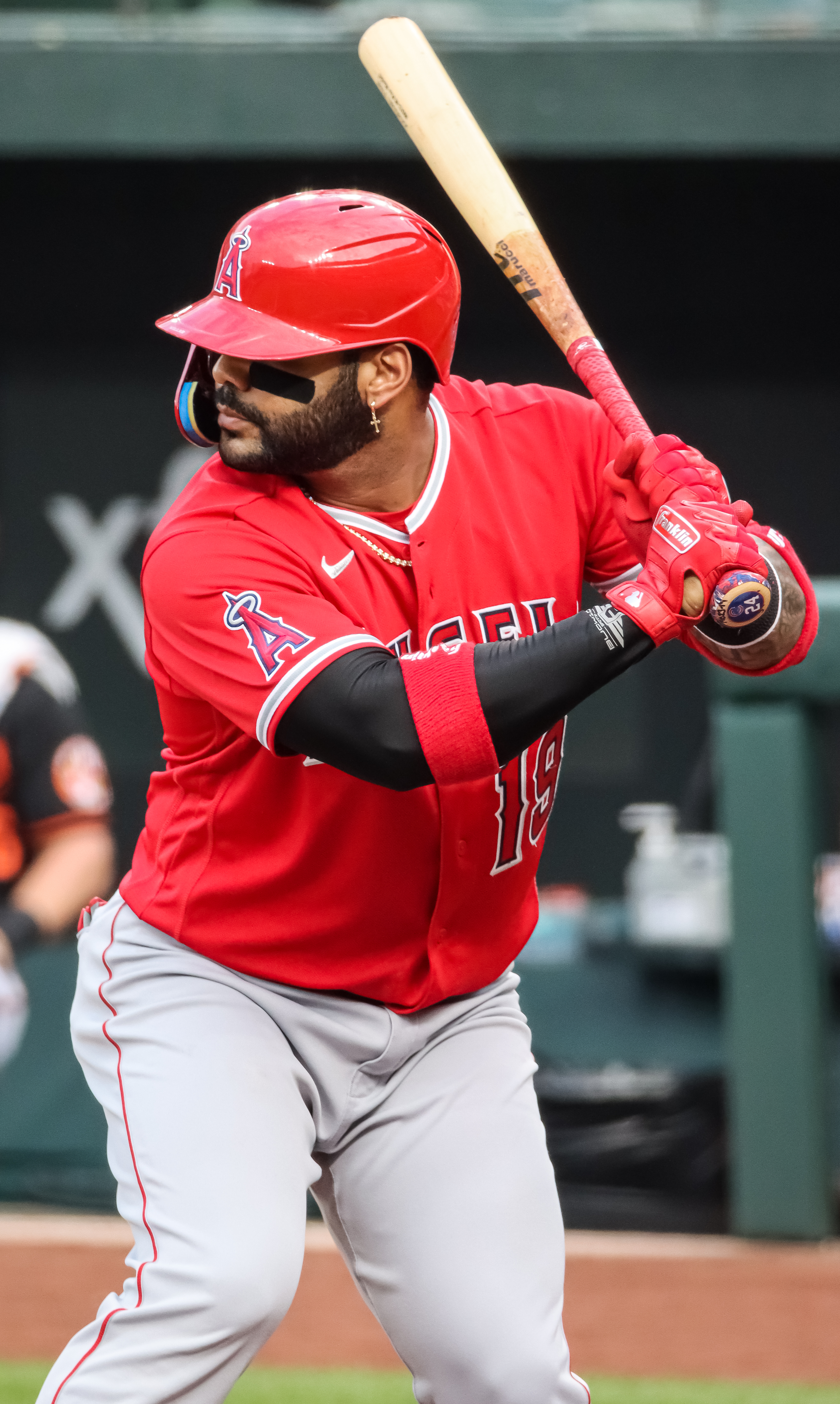
- Villar with the Los Angeles Angels in 2022

Caliente de Durango – No. 2
- Second baseman / Shortstop
- Born: May 2, 1991 (age 35); La Vega, Dominican Republic
- Bats: Switch Throws: Right

MLB debut
- July 22, 2013, for the Houston Astros

MLB statistics (through 2022 season)
- Batting average: .255
- Home runs: 101
- Runs batted in: 343
- Stolen bases: 239
- Stats at Baseball Reference

Teams
- Houston Astros (2013–2015); Milwaukee Brewers (2016–2018); Baltimore Orioles (2018–2019); Miami Marlins (2020); Toronto Blue Jays (2020); New York Mets (2021); Chicago Cubs (2022); Los Angeles Angels (2022)

Career highlights and awards
- MLB stolen base leader (2016)

Jonathan Rafael Villar Roque (born May 2, 1991) is a Dominican professional baseball second baseman for the Caliente de Durango of the Mexican League. He has previously played in Major League Baseball (MLB) for the Houston Astros, Milwaukee Brewers, Baltimore Orioles, Miami Marlins, Toronto Blue Jays, New York Mets, Chicago Cubs, and Los Angeles Angels. Prior to 2017, Villar was primarily a shortstop.

== Career ==
=== Philadelphia Phillies ===
==== Minor leagues ====
On May 20, 2008, Villar signed with the Philadelphia Phillies as an international free agent. He made his professional debut with the Dominican Summer League Phillies, hitting .271 with one home run, 21 RBI, and 27 stolen bases across 62 appearances.

Villar split the 2009 campaign between the rookie-level Gulf Coast League Phillies and Low-A Williamsport Crosscutters. In 42 games split between the two affiliates, he slashed .263/.346/.353 with no home runs, 19 RBI, and 17 stolen bases. Villar began the 2010 campaign with the Single-A Lakewood BlueClaws, playing in 100 games and batting .272/.332/.359 with two home runs, 36 RBI, and 38 stolen bases.

=== Houston Astros ===
On July 29, 2010, the Phillies traded Villar, J. A. Happ, and Anthony Gose to the Houston Astros in exchange for Roy Oswalt.

Villar was named the 94th best prospect in baseball by Baseball America prior to the 2011 season. He was invited to Astros' spring training in 2012. Villar played for the Oklahoma City RedHawks in 2013, and was named the Astros' minor league hitter of the month for June 2013.

==== Major leagues ====
On July 21, 2013, the Astros promoted Villar to the major leagues. On July 30, Villar stole home against the Baltimore Orioles. His strong finish to 2013 made him the team's Opening Day starter in 2014, but struggled offensively in 2014 as well as 2015. Nevertheless, he was named to the Astros' roster for the 2015 American League Wild Card Game. In the seventh inning, he pinch-ran for Chris Carter, stole second base, and scored on a single by Jose Altuve to make the score 3–0, which ended up being the final score of the game.

=== Milwaukee Brewers ===
The Astros traded Villar to the Milwaukee Brewers for Cy Sneed on November 19, 2015. Villar impressed Brewers manager Craig Counsell in Spring Training, and became the Brewers' Opening Day shortstop. Villar played very well for the first half of the season despite the team's struggles, posting a .298 batting average, 6 home runs and a league-leading 19 stolen bases before the All-Star Break. After top prospect Orlando Arcia was promoted to the Majors, Villar was moved to third base. He finished the year with 62 stolen bases, leading the league, four more than Billy Hamilton of the Cincinnati Reds, along with a .285 average, 62 RBIs, and 19 home runs. He led the National League in power-speed number (29.1).

After the acquisition of third baseman Travis Shaw, the Brewers announced that Villar would shift to second base. Villar struggled for most of 2017, and lost his starting job at second base after the Brewers traded for Neil Walker. With Keon Broxton struggling, Villar began to get regular starts in center field. Defensive struggles and the emergence of rookie outfielder Brett Phillips resulted in Villar once again returning to a bench role.

=== Baltimore Orioles ===
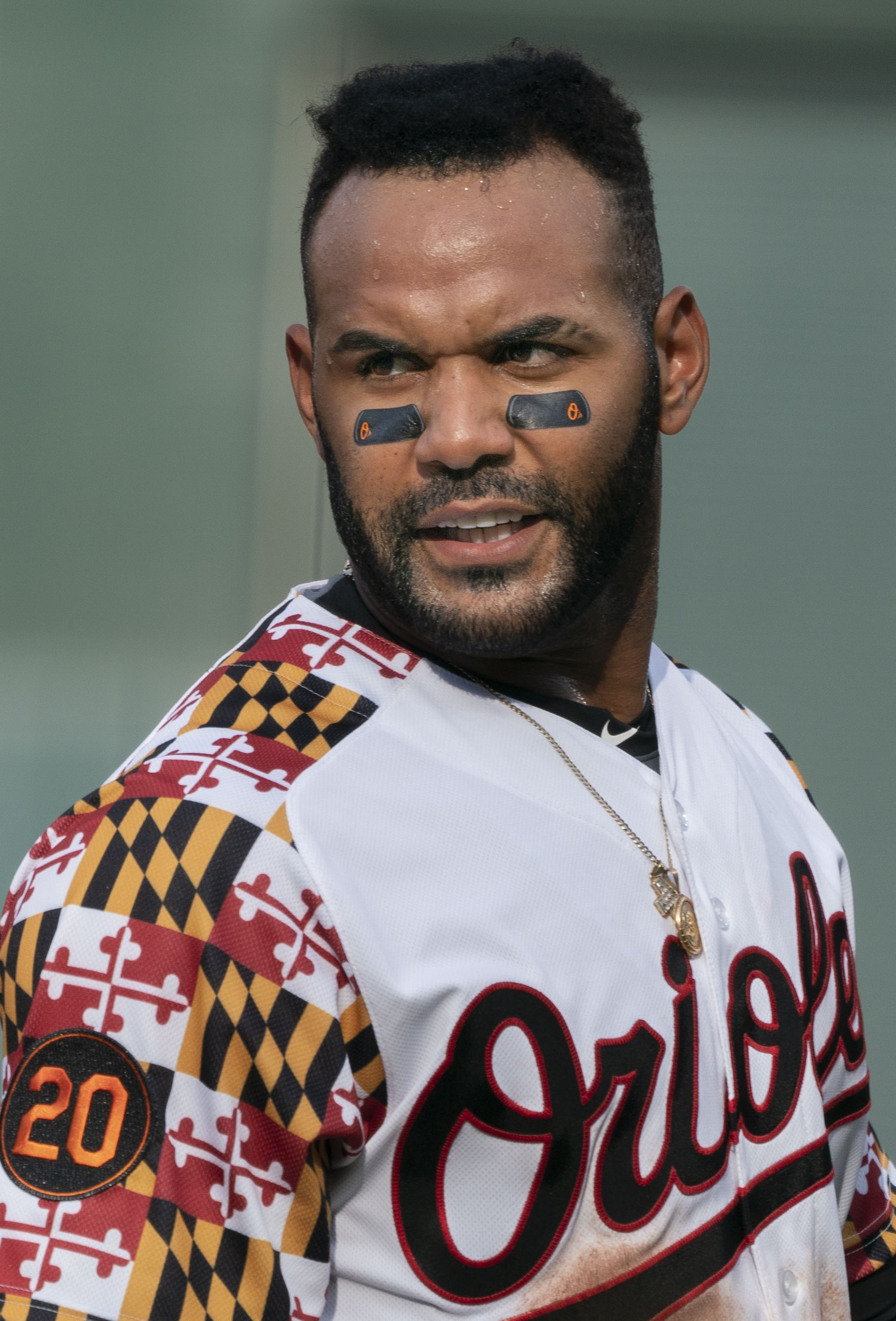
Villar with the Baltimore Orioles in 2019

At the trade deadline on July 31, 2018, Villar, along with minor leaguers Luis Ortiz and Jean Carmona, was sent to the Baltimore Orioles by the Brewers who acquired Jonathan Schoop for its postseason run. Villar was activated on August 2 and played his first game with the Orioles later that night. He collected two hits and scored a run in his Orioles debut. He collected three hits the next night, including his first RBI with the O's. Two nights later, he would collect three more hits in three at-bats, including a double, home run, one RBI, a walk and three runs scored. In 54 games, Villar hit .258/.336/.392 with eight home runs and led the Orioles with 21 stolen bases.

Villar became the fifth Oriole to hit for the cycle in a 9–6 home loss to the New York Yankees on August 5, 2019. He hit a triple and a double in the third and fifth innings respectively off Masahiro Tanaka, a two-run homer in the sixth off Tommy Kahnle that had tied the game at 6–6 and a single in the ninth off Aroldis Chapman. (Note: At the time Villar hit for the cycle, prior Orioles to accomplish the feat were Brooks Robinson, Cal Ripken Jr., Aubrey Huff and Félix Pie. Additional players also accomplished the feat for the franchise when the team was the St. Louis Browns.) His one-out three-run homer off Caleb Ferguson in the seventh inning of an Orioles' 7–3 home victory over the Los Angeles Dodgers on September 11 was the 6,106th of 2019 and established a new major league record for most total home runs in a season, surpassing the 6,105 set two years earlier in 2017. He was the first MLB player with at least 24 home runs and 40 stolen bases in the same season since Carlos Gómez in 2013. Along with Starlin Castro, Whit Merrifield, Marcus Semien and Jorge Soler, he was one of only five players to appear in all 162 games in 2019.

=== Miami Marlins ===
On December 2, 2019, Villar was traded to the Miami Marlins in exchange for Easton Lucas. With the Marlins in 2020, Villar batted .259 with two home runs and nine RBI in 30 games.

=== Toronto Blue Jays ===
On August 31, 2020, Villar was traded to the Toronto Blue Jays for Griffin Conine. On September 1, he made his Blue Jays debut. Overall with the 2020 Blue Jays, Villar batted .188 with no home run and six RBI in 22 games. After the 2020 season, he played for Dominican Republic in the 2021 Caribbean Series.

=== New York Mets ===
On February 11, 2021, Villar signed a one-year, $3.55 million contract with the New York Mets. Villar hit his first spring training home run as a Met on March 7, off of Miami Marlins pitcher Yimi García. He would go on to bat .249/.322/.416 with 18 home runs, 42 RBI, and 14 stolen bases in 142 games for the Mets. Villar elected for free agency following the season.

=== Chicago Cubs ===
On March 19, 2022, Villar signed a one-year, $6 million contract with the Chicago Cubs. On June 24, Villar was designated for assignment. On June 29, Villar was released by the Cubs.

=== Los Angeles Angels ===
On July 2, 2022, Villar signed a one-year contract with the Los Angeles Angels. On July 24, Villar was designated for assignment for the second time that season. In 13 games with the Angels, Villar batted .163/.226/.224 with one home run and three RBI. He cleared waivers and elected free agency on July 29.

=== Seattle Mariners ===
On August 1, 2022, Villar signed a minor league contract with the Seattle Mariners. In 37 games for the Triple–A Tacoma Rainiers, he hit .283/.329/.497 with 6 home runs, 24 RBI, and 10 stolen bases. Villar elected free agency following the season on November 10.

=== Algodoneros de Unión Laguna ===
On April 19, 2023, Villar signed with the Algodoneros de Unión Laguna of the Mexican League. In 85 games for Unión Laguna, he hit .346/.410/.508 with 11 home runs, 72 RBI, and 22 stolen bases.

Villar made 84 appearances for the Algodoneros in 2024 his second season with them, batting .325/.400/.417 with three home runs, 39 RBI, and 24 stolen bases.

Villar made 75 appearances for Unión Laguna during the 2025 campaign his third season with the team, hitting .258/.339/.351 with four home runs, 26 RBI, and 22 stolen bases.

=== Caliente de Durango ===
On October 10, 2025, Villar and Néstor Anguamea were traded to the Caliente de Durango of the Mexican League in exchange for Guadalupe Chávez.

== See also ==
- List of Major League Baseball annual stolen base leaders
- List of Major League Baseball players to hit for the cycle

== Notes ==
Achievements
Preceded by Trea Turner	Hitting for the cycle August 5, 2019	Succeeded by Cavan Biggio
