= The First Academy =

Location
- 2667 Bruton Boulevard; Orlando, Florida; United States; 28.512879°N 81.425757°W

Information
- Type: Private Christian
- Motto: A K4–12 Christ-centered, college-preparatory school
- Established: 1987
- Principal: Joyce Kwak, Jennifer Jackson
- Head of school: Steve Whitaker
- Grades: Preschool through Grade 12
- Enrollment: over 1,250
- Campus: 162,000 sq. ft. and 20 acres
- Colors: Royale blue and gold
- Mascot: Rowdy the Royal
- Yearbook: Legacy
- Website: www.thefirstacademy.org

The First Academy (TFA) is a private Christian school established in 1987 in Orlando, Florida. The school serves over 1,250 students from preschool through twelfth grade.

== Academics ==
The First Academy is an Orlando-based private Christian school for students from preschool to 12th grade. It is an Apple Distinguished School and was named Orlando's Best Private School by Orlando Magazine in 2017, and the second-best private school by Southwest Orlando Bulletin in 2016.

== Language Programs ==
The language programs at The First Academy consist of Latin, Mandarin, and Spanish. These specific courses are taught by teachers who have a unique testimony each, as some may take place either inside or outside the United States. As in grade 8 students can take a Language Honors Class, giving high school credit early to those who choose to take one of the three classes provided, as midterms will also be provided around halfway through the year for comprehension check.

As a member of the Florida High School Athletic Association (FHSAA), The First Academy Royals participate in over 22 interscholastic sports at the varsity, junior varsity, and middle school levels.

== 2016 Incident ==
In 2016, students at the school caused controversy by holding an "Instagram debate on the N-word"—some former students claimed to have experienced racism and homophobia while attending the institution. School officials denounced what had happened and implemented changes to improve race relations.

== The City Beautiful Invitational ==
The First Academy hosts a 16-team annual Christmas basketball tournament called the CIty Beautiful Invitational, last contested (as of 2022) in 2019.

== Notable alumni ==
- Adam Haseley, baseball player for the Philadelphia Phillies
- Fletcher Magee, basketball player for Wofford College, All-Time leader in 3-pointers made in NCAA
- Teahna Daniels, track sprinter, World and Olympic Medalist
- Foster Griffin, baseball player for the Cleveland Guardians
