= Nobuyuki Okumura =

Japanese baseball player (born 1995)

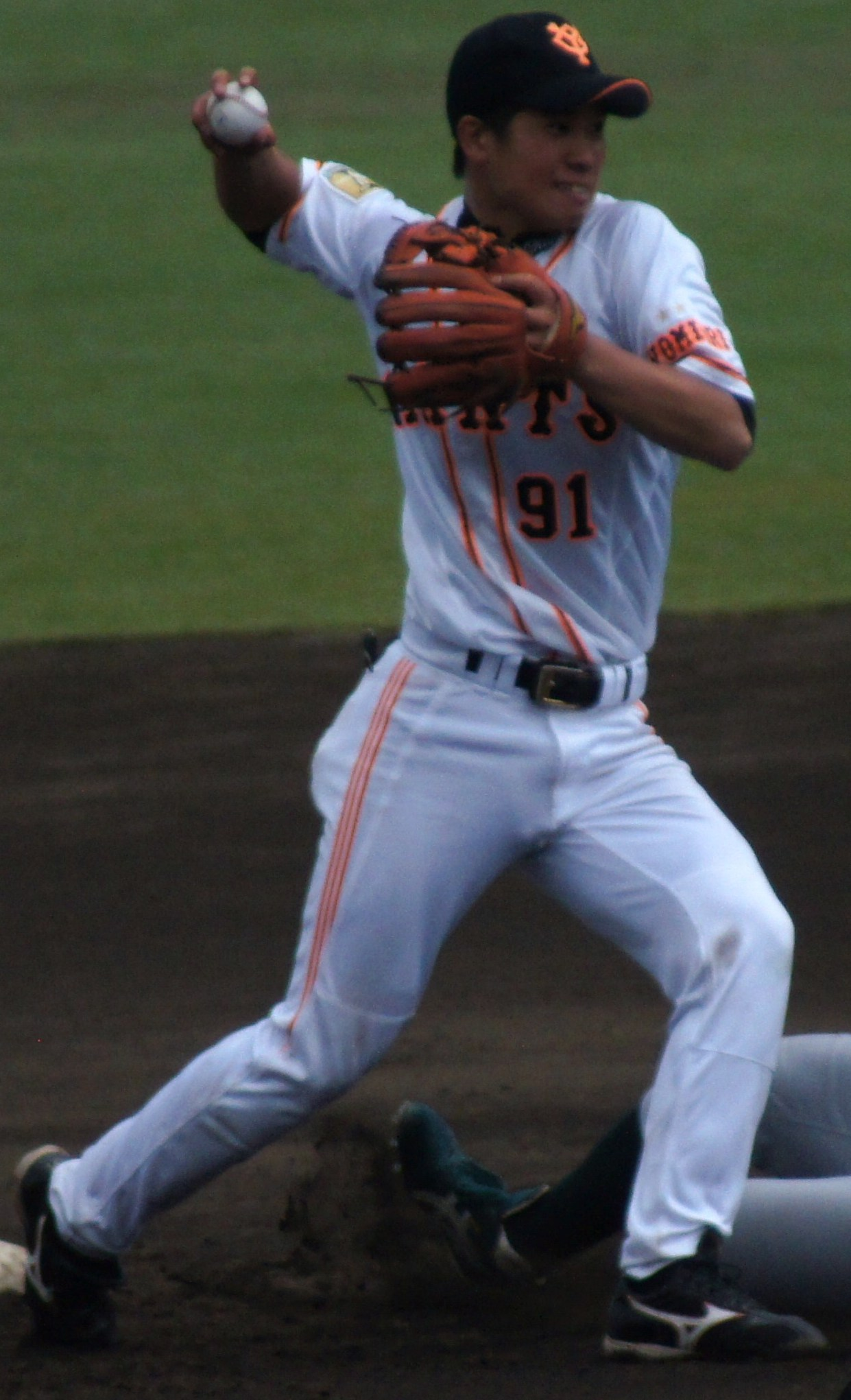
- Infielder / Coach
- Born: May 26, 1995 (age 31); Konan, Shiga, Japan
- Batted: Left Threw: Right

debut
- July 9, 2016, for the Tokyo Yakult Swallows

Last appearance
- May 17, 2023, for the Tokyo Yakult Swallows

Career statistics (through 2023 season)
- Batting average: .199
- Hits: 78
- Home runs: 2
- RBIs: 24
- Stolen bases: 1
- Stats at Baseball Reference

Teams
- As player: Yomiuri Giants (2014); Tokyo Yakult Swallows (2015–2023); As coach: Tohoku Rakuten Golden Eagles (2024-2025)
Medals
Men's baseball
Representing Japan
18U Baseball World Cup
Silver medal – second place	2013 Taichung	Team

Nobuyuki Okumura (奥村 展征, Okumura Nobuyuki; born May 26, 1995 in Konan, Shiga, Japan) is a Japanese former professional baseball player and coach.
