= 1913–14 University of Virginia men's basketball team =

American college basketball season

1913–14 University of Virginia men's basketball
- Conference: South Atlantic Intercollegiate Athletic Association
- Record: 12–1–1 (2–0–1 SAIAA)
- Head coach: Henry Lannigan (9th season)
- Home arena: Fayerweather Gymnasium

The 1913–14 University of Virginia men's basketball team represented the University of Virginia during the 1913–14 NCAA men's basketball season. The team was led by ninth-year head coach Henry Lannigan, and played their home games at Fayerweather Gymnasium in Charlottesville, Virginia. Now known as the Virginia Cavaliers, the team did not have an official nickname prior to 1923. The season is notable for the only tie game in the program's history, as well as the first overtime game involving Virginia.

== Schedule ==
Date time, TV	Opponent	Result	Record	Site city, state
Regular season
January 10* no, no	Randolph–Macon	W 61–9	1–0–0	Fayerweather Gymnasium; Charlottesville, VA
January 12* no, no	George Washington	W 43–7	2–0–0	Fayerweather Gymnasium; Charlottesville, VA
January 17* no, no	Gallaudet	W 55–9	3–0–0	Fayerweather Gymnasium; Charlottesville, VA
January 22* no, no	Kentucky	W 39–23	4–0–0	Fayerweather Gymnasium; Charlottesville, VA
January 24* no, no	Catholic	W 62–22	5–0–0	Fayerweather Gymnasium; Charlottesville, VA
February 7 no, no	vs. Washington and Lee	T 35–35	5–0–1 (0–0–1)	Lynchburg, VA
February 9 no, no	vs. North Carolina	W 67–27	6–0–1 (1–0–1)	Raleigh, NC
February 10* no, no	vs. Duke	W 51–21	7–0–1 (1–0–1)	Raleigh, NC
February 17* no, no	Wake Forest	W 80–16	8–0–1 (1–0–1)	Fayerweather Gymnasium; Charlottesville, VA
February 20* no, no	vs. VMI	W 51–14	9–0–1 (1–0–1)	Staunton, VA
February 26* no, no	at George Washington	W 41–16	10–0–1 (1–0–1)	Washington, DC
February 27* no, no	at Catholic	L 28–30 ^{OT}	10–1–1 (1–0–1)	Washington, DC
February 28* no, no	at Loyola	W 34–33	11–1–1 (1–0–1)	Baltimore, MD
March 4 no, no	North Carolina	W 66–23	12–1–1 (2–0–1)	Fayerweather Gymnasium; Charlottesville, VA
March 10* no, no	at Richmond YMCA	W 18–9		Richmond, VA
*Non-conference game. (#) Tournament seedings in parentheses. All times are in Eastern Time.
