= 1907–08 University of Virginia men's basketball team =

American college basketball season

1907–08 University of Virginia men's basketball
- Conference: South Atlantic Intercollegiate Athletic Association
- Record: 5–5 (2–2 SAIAA)
- Head coach: Henry Lannigan (3rd season)
- Home arena: Fayerweather Gymnasium

The 1907–08 University of Virginia men's basketball team represented the University of Virginia during the 1907–08 IAAUS men's basketball season. The team was led by third-year head coach Henry Lannigan, and played their home games at Fayerweather Gymnasium in Charlottesville, Virginia. Now known as the Virginia Cavaliers, the team did not have an official nickname prior to 1923.

== Schedule ==
Date time, TV	Opponent	Result	Record	Site city, state
Regular season
January 10 no, no	at William & Mary	W 36–22	1–0 (1–0)	Fayerweather Gymnasium; Charlottesville, VA
January 17* no, no	Washington & Lee	L 21–23	1–1 (1–0)	Fayerweather Gymnasium; Charlottesville, VA
January 25* no, no	at Staunton Military Academy	L 16–22	1–2 (1–0)	Staunton, VA
January 28* no, no	Charlottesville High School	W 45–22	2–2 (1–0)	Fayerweather Gymnasium; Charlottesville, VA
February 1 no, no	Georgetown	L 19–42	2–3 (1–1)	Fayerweather Gymnasium; Charlottesville, VA
February 7* no, no	at George Washington	W 22–10	3–3 (1–1)	Washington Light Infantry Armory; Washington, DC
February 8 no, no	at Georgetown	L 12–64	3–4 (1–2)	Washington, DC
February 20* no, no	at Washington & Lee	L 22–35	3–5 (1–2)	Lexington, VA
February 25 no, no	William & Mary	W 30–8	4–5 (2–2)	Fayerweather Gymnasium; Charlottesville, VA
February 29* no, no	George Washington	W 36–10	5–5 (2–2)	Fayerweather Gymnasium; Charlottesville, VA
*Non-conference game. (#) Tournament seedings in parentheses. All times are in Eastern Time.
