= 1917–18 University of Virginia men's basketball team =

American college basketball season

1917–18 University of Virginia men's basketball
- Conference: South Atlantic Intercollegiate Athletic Association
- Record: 7–1 (5–1 SAIAA)
- Head coach: Henry Lannigan (13th season)
- Home arena: Fayerweather Gymnasium

The 1917–18 University of Virginia men's basketball team represented the University of Virginia during the 1917–18 NCAA men's basketball season. The team was led by thirteenth-year head coach Henry Lannigan, and played their home games at Fayerweather Gymnasium in Charlottesville, Virginia. Now known as the Virginia Cavaliers, the team did not have an official nickname prior to 1923.

== Schedule ==
Date time, TV	Opponent	Result	Record	Site city, state
Regular season
January 17 no, no	Richmond	W 41–15	1–0 (1–0)	Fayerweather Gymnasium; Charlottesville, VA
January 25* no, no	Elon	W 29–15	2–0 (1–0)	Fayerweather Gymnasium; Charlottesville, VA
January 28 no, no	VMI	W 49–5	3–0 (2–0)	Fayerweather Gymnasium; Charlottesville, VA
February 2 no, no	VMI	W 31–20	4–0 (3–0)	Fayerweather Gymnasium; Charlottesville, VA
February 13 no, no	at Duke	W 39–17	5–0 (4–0)	Lexington, VA
February 14 no, no	North Carolina	L 25–26	5–1 (4–1)	Lynchburg, VA
February 19* no, no	vs. Tennessee	W 37–32	6–1 (4–1)	Fayerweather Gymnasium; Charlottesville, VA
February 22 no, no	Tennessee	W 30–19	7–1 (5–1)	Fayerweather Gymnasium; Charlottesville, VA
*Non-conference game. (#) Tournament seedings in parentheses. All times are in Eastern Time.
