= Luis Ortiz (pitcher, born 1995) =

American baseball player (born 1995)

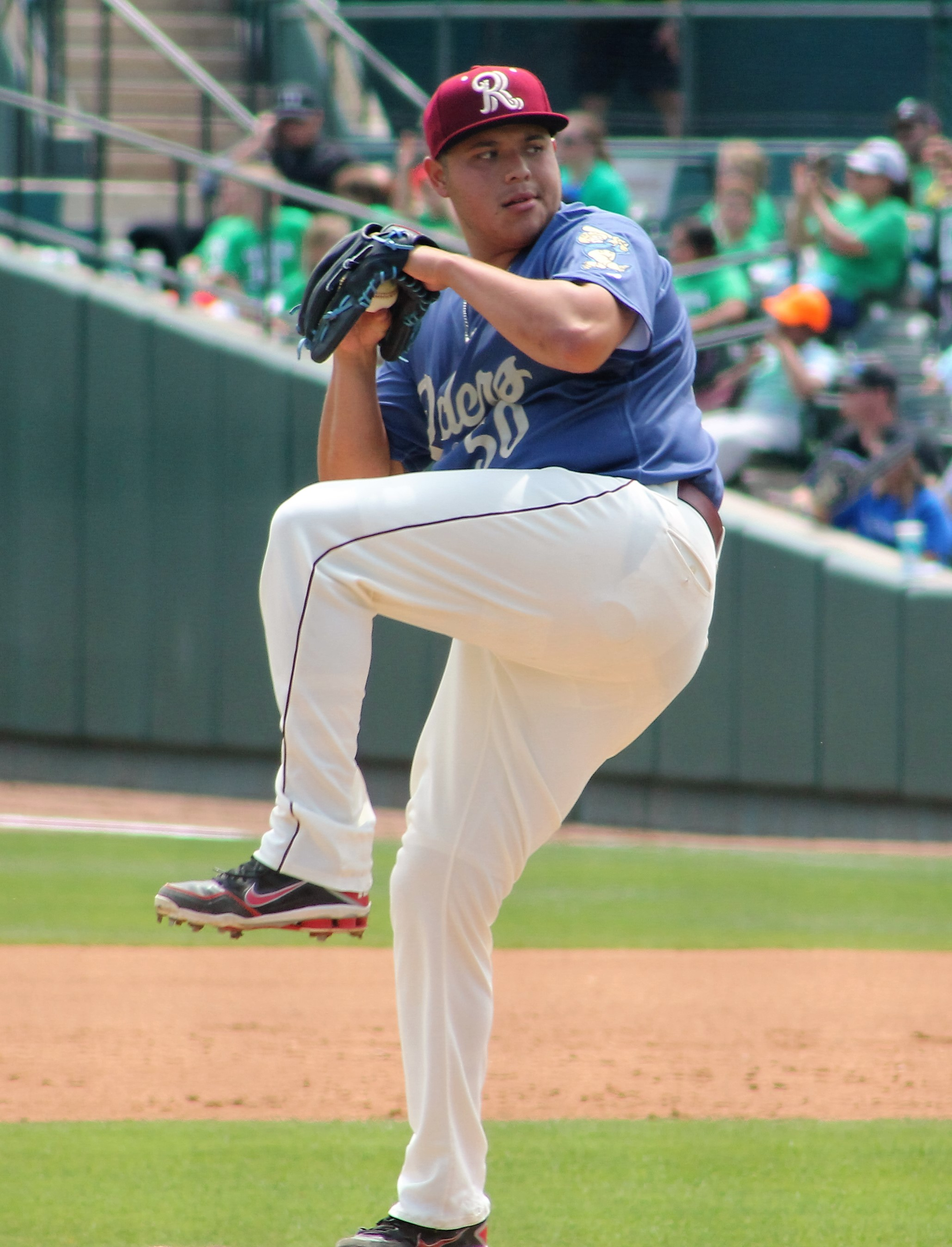
- Ortiz with the Frisco RoughRiders in 2016

Free agent
- Pitcher
- Born: September 22, 1995 (age 30); Sanger, California, U.S.
- Bats: Right Throws: Right

MLB debut
- September 7, 2018, for the Baltimore Orioles

MLB statistics (through 2024 season)
- Win–loss record: 0–2
- Earned run average: 4.76
- Strikeouts: 25
- Stats at Baseball Reference

Teams
- Baltimore Orioles (2018–2019); San Francisco Giants (2022); Philadelphia Phillies (2023–2024)
Medals
Men's baseball
Representing United States
18U Baseball World Cup
Gold medal – first place	2013 Taichung	Team

Luis Francisco Ortiz (born September 22, 1995) is an American professional baseball pitcher who is a free agent. The Texas Rangers selected Ortiz in the first round of the 2014 Major League Baseball draft. He made his MLB debut in 2018. He has previously played in Major League Baseball (MLB) for the Baltimore Orioles, San Francisco Giants, and Philadelphia Phillies.

== Career ==
Ortiz is of Mexican American descent.

=== High school and international ===
Ortiz attended Sanger High School in Sanger, California. In his senior season, he had a 1.04 ERA with 72 strikeouts and 7 walks in 43.2 innings, while missing a few starts due to a forearm strain.

He was a closer for the 18-and-under USA Baseball national team that won a gold medal, and Ortiz won the World Cup MVP award. He had a win and three saves in five games with the team. ESPN.com's Keith Law ranked him No. 10 on his top-100 prospects list. In November 2013, he committed to play college baseball at Fresno State University.

=== Texas Rangers ===
The Texas Rangers selected Ortiz 30th overall in the first round of the 2014 Major League Baseball draft. He signed on June 11 for a signing bonus of $1.75 million. Texas Rangers general manager Jon Daniels said "[He has] good pure stuff and is a strike thrower with a big fastball with life. His out-pitch is a power slider. He has a repeatable delivery. He's a big-time competitor."

Ortiz reported to the 2014 AZL Rangers. After posting a 2.03 ERA in 13.1 innings in which he had 15 strikeouts, he was promoted to the Hickory Crawdads, where he posted a 1.29 ERA in seven innings in which he had four strikeouts.

He spent 2015 with Hickory, going 4–1 with a 1.80 ERA in 13 games started, pitching 50 innings in which Ortiz had 46 strikeouts. He was named a South Atlantic League Mid-Season All Star. He was on the disabled list for over two months with right forearm strain. He pitched for Surprise in the Arizona Fall League, and had a 1.80 ERA in five innings of relief.

After being ranked the #4 prospect in the Rangers system by Baseball America, Ortiz started 2016 with the High Desert Mavericks going 3–2 with a 2.60 ERA in 27.2 innings in seven games (six starts). He was then promoted to the Frisco RoughRiders, where he was 1–4 with a 4.08 ERA in 9 games (8 starts).

=== Milwaukee Brewers ===
On August 1, 2016, the Rangers traded Ortiz, outfielder Lewis Brinson, and outfielder Ryan Cordell to the Milwaukee Brewers in exchange for catcher Jonathan Lucroy and pitcher Jeremy Jeffress. He was assigned to the Double–A Biloxi Shuckers. In 22 games between High Desert, Frisco, and Biloxi, Oritz posted a 6–8 record with one save and a 3.08 ERA in 22 games (20 starts). At the time, his pitching repertoire consisted of a 93–96 mph plus fastball with some movement, an above-average 83–85 mph slider, and an average changeup.

After being ranked the #3 prospect in the Brewers system by Baseball America, Oritz returned to Biloxi in 2017. He pitched to a 4–7 record and 4.01 ERA in 94.1 innings pitched in 22 games (20 starts).

MLB.com ranked Ortiz as Milwaukee's fifth-best prospect going into the 2018 season, and Baseball America ranked him as its #4 prospect. He began the season with Biloxi. In July, he represented the Brewers in the 2018 All-Star Futures Game.

=== Baltimore Orioles ===
On July 31, 2018, Ortiz, Jonathan Villar and Jean Carmona were traded to the Baltimore Orioles in exchange for Jonathan Schoop. Pitching for the Triple–A Norfolk Tides (with whom he was the youngest player on the team's roster at 22 years of age) and Double–A Biloxi in 2018, he was a combined 5–5 with two saves and a 3.70 ERA as in 22 games (17 starts) in 99 2/3 innings he gave up 26 walks and had 86 strikeouts. Ortiz had his contract selected to the major league roster on September 4. He pitched 2 1/3 major league innings in 2018.

In 2019, Ortiz was optioned to Triple–A Norfolk to open the season. After being put on the injured list on July 4, 2019, he made only one appearance the rest of the season. Ortiz was removed from the 40-man roster and sent outright to Norfolk on October 30. Ortiz did not play in a game in 2020 due to the cancellation of the minor league season because of the COVID-19 pandemic. He became a free agent on November 2, 2020.

=== Texas Rangers (second stint) ===
On December 16, 2020, Ortiz signed a minor league contract with the Texas Rangers. Ortiz spent the 2021 season with the Triple-A Round Rock Express. He made 28 appearances (4 starts), going 2–2 with a 4.60 ERA and 44 strikeouts in 44 innings. He became a free agent on November 17, 2021.

=== San Francisco Giants ===
On February 2, 2022, Ortiz signed a minor league contract with the San Francisco Giants. Pitching for the Triple-A Sacramento River Cats in 2022, he was 4–3 with two saves and a 4.54 ERA in 35 games (four starts), as in 67.1 innings he had 13 walks and 72 strikeouts. On September 7, Ortiz was selected to the major league roster. With the Giants, Ortiz posted a 1.04 ERA with 6 strikeouts in 8 2/3 innings of work.

=== Philadelphia Phillies ===
On November 9, 2022, Ortiz was claimed off waivers by the Philadelphia Phillies. Ortiz was optioned to the Triple–A Lehigh Valley IronPigs to begin the 2023 season. In 14 games for the Phillies, he recorded a 3.32 ERA with 16 strikeouts across 19 innings pitched.

Ortiz made one appearance for the Phillies in 2024 before he suffered a left ankle sprain and was placed on the injured list on March 31. While on rehab assignment, he injured his forearm, and was transferred to the 60-day injured list on July 5. It was later announced that Ortiz had undergone Tommy John surgery, ending his season prematurely. On November 4, Ortiz was removed from the 40-man roster and sent outright to Lehigh Valley. Two days later, he elected free agency.

=== New York Mets ===
On December 20, 2024, Ortiz signed a minor league contract with the New York Mets. On July 28, 2025, he was placed on the full-season injured list, ruling him out for the season without making an appearance. Ortiz was released by the Mets organization on January 27, 2026.
