= Taisuke Yamaoka =

Japanese baseball player (born 1995)

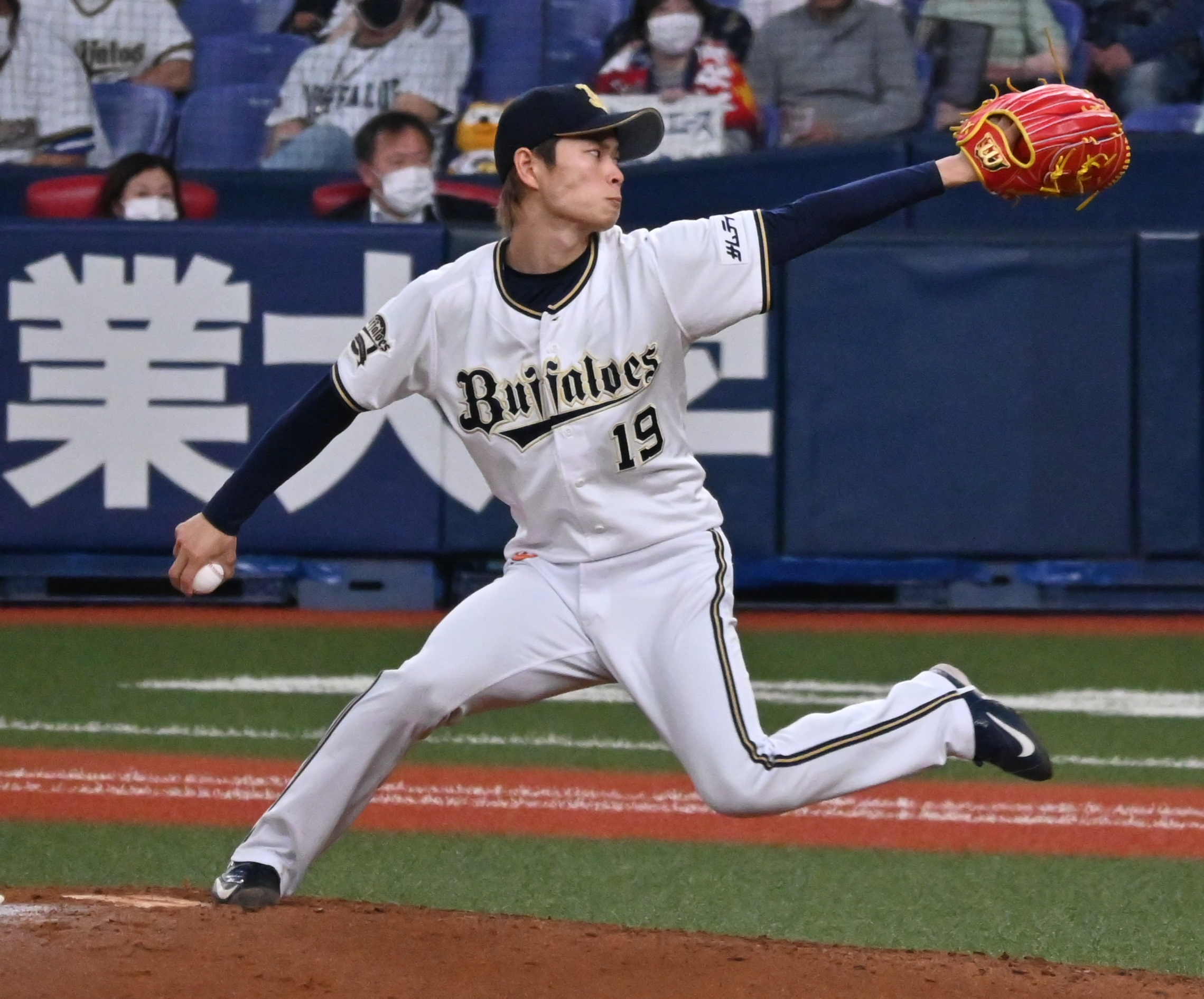
- Yamaoka in 2022 with the Orix Buffaloes

Orix Buffaloes – No. 19
- Pitcher
- Born: September 22, 1995 (age 30); Hiroshima, Hiroshima, Japan
- Bats: Left Throws: Right

NPB debut
- April 13, 2017, for the Orix Buffaloes

NPB statistics (through 2024 season)
- Win–loss record: 43-45
- ERA: 3.35
- Strikeouts: 747
- Stats at Baseball Reference

Teams
- Orix Buffaloes (2017–present)

Career highlights and awards
- 3× NPB All-Star (2017, 2019, 2022); Japan Series champion (2022)
Medals
Men's baseball
Representing Japan
18U Baseball World Cup
Silver medal – second place	2013 Taichung	Team
WBSC Premier12
Gold medal – first place	2019 Tokyo	Team

Taisuke Yamaoka (山岡 泰輔, Yamaoka Taisuke; born September 22, 1995) is a Japanese professional baseball pitcher for the Orix Buffaloes of Nippon Professional Baseball (NPB).

== International career ==
Yamaoka represented the Japan national baseball team in the 2019 exhibition games against Mexico and 2019 WBSC Premier12.

On February 27, 2019, he was selected for Japan national baseball team at the 2019 exhibition games against Mexico.

On October 1, 2019, he was selected at the 2019 WBSC Premier12.
