= Griff O'Ferrall =

American baseball player (born 2003)

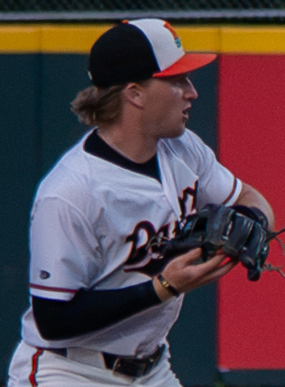
- O'Ferrall with the Chesapeake Baysox in 2026

Baltimore Orioles
- Shortstop
- Born: February 2, 2003 (age 23); Richmond, Virginia, U.S.
- Bats: Right Throws: Right
- Stats at Baseball Reference

James Griffin O'Ferrall (born February 2, 2003) is an American professional baseball shortstop in the Baltimore Orioles organization. He played college baseball for the Virginia Cavaliers. The Orioles selected O'Ferrall with the 32nd overall pick in the 2024 MLB draft.

== Amateur career ==
O'Ferrall attended St. Christopher's School in Richmond, Virginia. In 2021, his senior year, he was named the Gatorade Baseball Player of the Year for Virginia. After graduating, he played for the Auburn Doubledays of the Perfect Game Collegiate Baseball League, a collegiate summer baseball league.

While also receiving interest from the college baseball programs at James Madison University, Virginia Commonwealth University, and Old Dominion University, O'Ferrall chose to enroll at the University of Virginia to play for the Virginia Cavaliers. In 2022, he played collegiate summer baseball for the Kalamazoo Growlers of the Northwoods League. He was selected to the United States national collegiate baseball team in 2023. In 2024, O'Ferrall won the Brooks Wallace Award as the top collegiate shortstop and an ABCA/Rawlings Gold Glove Award.

== Professional career ==
The Baltimore Orioles drafted O'Ferrall with the 32nd overall selection in the 2024 Major League Baseball draft. He signed with the team on July 19 for a $2.7 million bonus.

O'Ferrall made his professional debut after signing with the Delmarva Shorebirds of the Low-A Carolina League. After 15 games, he was promoted to the Aberdeen IronBirds of the High-A South Atlantic League. Across 20 games for the 2024 season, he hit .250 with eight RBI. O'Ferrall returned to Aberdeen to begin 2025 and was promoted to the Chesapeake Baysox of the Double-A Eastern League near the season's end. He played in a total of 121 games for the season and batted .228 with four home runs, 38 RBI and 44 stolen bases. O'Ferrall returned to Chesapeake to start the 2026 season.
