= 1916–17 University of Virginia men's basketball team =

American college basketball season

1916–17 University of Virginia men's basketball
- Conference: South Atlantic Intercollegiate Athletic Association
- Record: 7–5 (2–1 SAIAA)
- Head coach: Henry Lannigan (12th season)
- Home arena: Fayerweather Gymnasium

The 1916–17 University of Virginia men's basketball team represented the University of Virginia during the 1916–17 NCAA men's basketball season. The team was led by twelfth-year head coach Henry Lannigan, and played their home games at Fayerweather Gymnasium in Charlottesville, Virginia. Now known as the Virginia Cavaliers, the team did not have an official nickname prior to 1923.

== Schedule ==
Date time, TV	Opponent	Result	Record	Site city, state
Regular season
January 13* no, no	Gallaudet	W 41–15	1–0	Fayerweather Gymnasium; Charlottesville, VA
January 18 no, no	St. John's	W 29–15	2–0 (1–0)	Fayerweather Gymnasium; Charlottesville, VA
January 20* no, no	Randolph–Macon	W 49–5	3–0 (1–0)	Fayerweather Gymnasium; Charlottesville, VA
January 24 no, no	Richmond	W 31–20	4–0 (2–0)	Fayerweather Gymnasium; Charlottesville, VA
January 31* no, no	at Navy	L 17–39	4–1 (2–0)	Dahlgren Hall; Annapolis, MD
February 5* no, no	West Virginia	W 26–25	5–1 (2–0)	Fayerweather Gymnasium; Charlottesville, VA
February 8* no, no	West Virginia Wesleyan	W 37–32	6–1 (2–0)	Fayerweather Gymnasium; Charlottesville, VA
February 10* no, no	at VMI	L 19–30	6–2 (2–0)	Lexington, VA
February 15* no, no	Duke	L 34–37	6–3 (2–0)	Fayerweather Gymnasium; Charlottesville, VA
February 20* no, no	Wake Forest	W 38–13	7–3 (2–0)	Fayerweather Gymnasium; Charlottesville, VA
February 22* no, no	Tennessee	L 21–24	7–4 (2–0)	Fayerweather Gymnasium; Charlottesville, VA
February 24 no, no	vs. North Carolina	L 24–35	7–5 (2–1)	Lynchburg, VA
*Non-conference game. (#) Tournament seedings in parentheses. All times are in Eastern Time.
