= 1918–19 University of Virginia men's basketball team =

American college basketball season

1918–19 University of Virginia men's basketball
- Conference: South Atlantic Intercollegiate Athletic Association
- Record: 11–4 (3–1 SAIAA)
- Head coach: Henry Lannigan (14th season)
- Home arena: Fayerweather Gymnasium

The 1918–19 University of Virginia men's basketball team represented the University of Virginia during the 1918–19 NCAA men's basketball season. The team was led by fourteenth-year head coach Henry Lannigan, and played their home games at Fayerweather Gymnasium in Charlottesville, Virginia. Now known as the Virginia Cavaliers, the team did not have an official nickname prior to 1923.

== Schedule ==
Date time, TV	Opponent	Result	Record	Site city, state
Regular season
January 16* no, no	Randolph–Macon	W 60–15	1–0	Fayerweather Gymnasium; Charlottesville, VA
January 18* no, no	Fort Myer	W 53–15	2–0	Fayerweather Gymnasium; Charlottesville, VA
January 24* no, no	Gallaudet	L 32–38	2–1	Fayerweather Gymnasium; Charlottesville, VA
January 25* no, no	at Navy	L 16–57	2–2	Dahlgren Hall; Annapolis, MD
February 1* no, no	Camp Humphreys	L 28–30	2–3	Fayerweather Gymnasium; Charlottesville, VA
February 8* no, no	Lynchburg Athletic Club	W 48–29	3–3	Fayerweather Gymnasium; Charlottesville, VA
February 15 no, no	North Carolina	W 40–29	4–3 (1–0)	Fayerweather Gymnasium; Charlottesville, VA
February 19* no, no	Gallaudet	W 49–29	5–3 (1–0)	Fayerweather Gymnasium; Charlottesville, VA
February 21 no, no	VMI	L 25–33	5–4 (1–1)	Fayerweather Gymnasium; Charlottesville, VA
February 22* no, no	Wake Forest	W 33–29 ^{OT}	6–4 (1–1)	Fayerweather Gymnasium; Charlottesville, VA
February 24* no, no	Duke	W 44–14	7–4 (1–1)	Fayerweather Gymnasium; Charlottesville, VA
February 25* no, no	Medical College of Virginia	W 53–30	8–4 (1–1)	Fayerweather Gymnasium; Charlottesville, VA
February 26* no, no	at Wake Forest	W 40–32	9–4 (1–1)	Winston-Salem, North Carolina
February 27 no, no	vs. North Carolina	W 31–21	10–4 (2–1)	Raleigh, NC
March 1 no, no	at VMI	W 33–25	11–4 (3–1)	Lexington, VA
*Non-conference game. (#) Tournament seedings in parentheses. All times are in Eastern Time.
