= Evan Male =

American college basketball/baseball coach and athletic administrator

Biographical details
- Born: July 31, 1913
- Died: June 26, 1992 (aged 78); Charlottesville, Virginia, U.S.

Playing career

Basketball
- 1934–1937: Virginia

Football
- 1935–1937: Virginia

Baseball
- 1935–1937: Virginia

Coaching career (HC unless noted)

Basketball
- 1951–1957: Virginia

Football
- 1948–?: Virginia (assistant)

Baseball
- 1956–1959: Virginia

Head coaching record
- Overall: 67–88 (basketball); 37–49 (baseball)

Evan J. "Bus" Male (July 31, 1913 – June 26, 1992) was an American college basketball and baseball coach and athletic administrator. He spent his entire career at the University of Virginia.

Male was a three-sport athlete at Virginia (UVA) in the 1930s – earning nine varsity letters. Male returned to his alma mater in 1948 to become freshman football coach to begin a career in the UVA athletic department that lasted until his retirement in 1965. From 1951 to 1957, Male served as the head men's basketball coach for the Cavaliers. He led the program into the newly formed Atlantic Coast Conference (ACC) in 1953 and finished his six-year tenure with a record of 67–88. From 1956 to 1959 he was head baseball coach, with a record of 37–49 in four seasons.

Following the end of his coaching career, Male worked in the Virginia athletic department in a variety of roles until retiring in 1965. He died on June 26, 1992, in Charlottesville, Virginia, at age 78.
