= Adam Haseley =

American baseball player (born 1996)

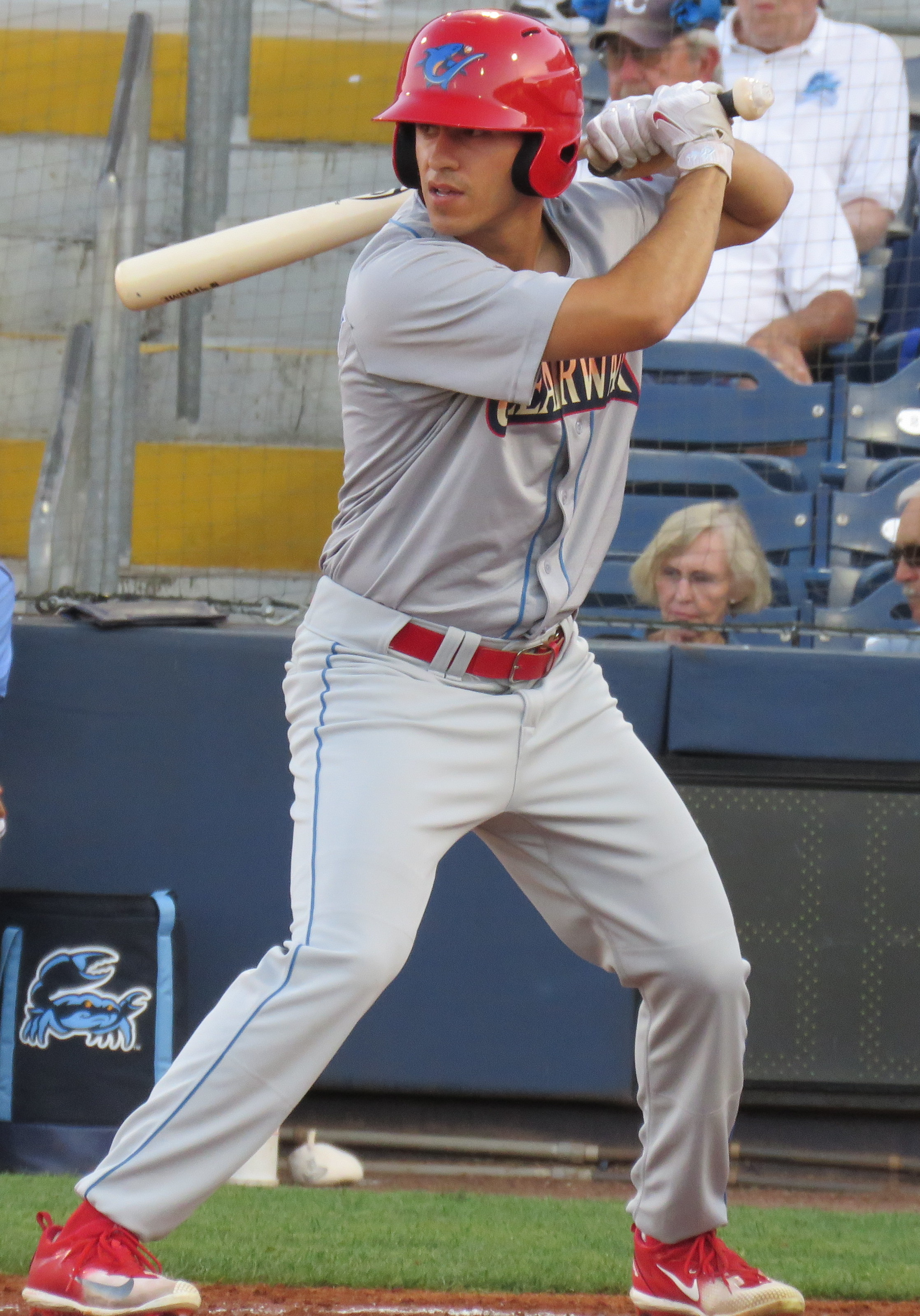
- Haseley playing for the Clearwater Threshers
- Outfielder
- Born: April 12, 1996 (age 30); Orlando, Florida, U.S.
- Batted: Left Threw: Left

MLB debut
- June 4, 2019, for the Philadelphia Phillies

Last MLB appearance
- June 29, 2023, for the Chicago White Sox

MLB statistics
- Batting average: .259
- Home runs: 5
- Runs batted in: 43
- Stats at Baseball Reference

Teams
- Philadelphia Phillies (2019–2021); Chicago White Sox (2022–2023)
Medals
Men's baseball
Representing United States
18U Baseball World Cup
Gold medal – first place	2013 Taichung	Team

Adam Donald Haseley (/ˈheɪzliː/ HAYZ-lee; born April 12, 1996) is an American former professional baseball outfielder. He has previously played in Major League Baseball (MLB) for the Philadelphia Phillies and Chicago White Sox. The Phillies selected him with the eighth overall selection in the first round of the 2017 MLB draft. Haseley made his major league debut in 2019 and played for the Phillies through 2021.

== Early life ==
Haseley was born on April 14, 1996, in Orlando, Florida, to Rich and Mary-Kay Haseley. He began playing tee-ball at the local YMCA in Windermere, Florida, at the age of five, and began playing Little League Baseball when he was nine. At the age of twelve, Haseley played in the Cooperstown Dreams Park National Invitational Tournament with his Little League team.

Haseley attended high school at The First Academy in Orlando. As a high school baseball player, Haseley was a three-time first-team all-district honoree, and played on the team that won the 2014 USA Baseball National High School Invitational. During his senior season, Haseley suffered a perforated eardrum on his way home from a tournament in North Carolina, an issue that continued into his college career. On February 4, 2020, The First Academy inducted Haseley into their school hall of fame. Haseley also represented USA Baseball twice internationally, and was part of the gold-medal winning 2013 under-18 team.

== Amateur career ==
Haseley was born in Orlando, Florida, is from Windermere, Florida, and attended The First Academy (TFA) in Orlando. While at TFA, he was named first-team all-district three times. Haseley represented Team USA at various youth levels. He was a member of the 18U Team that won the 2013 18U Baseball World Cup, in Taichung, Taiwan.

Haseley made his collegiate debut, for the University of Virginia, on April 1, 2015, in a relief appearance against VMI. Despite only pitching in four games that season, he was called upon to start Game Two of the 2015 College World Series finals against Vanderbilt, with Virginia trailing 1–0 in the series. Haseley pitched five scoreless innings and allowed just four hits in an eventual 3–0 win, forcing a third game. The Cavaliers won the program's first College World Series the following day.

In his sophomore year, Haseley had a 9–3 win–loss record with a 1.73 earned run average (ERA) as a starting pitcher, while batting .304. He was named third-team all-American at utility by Baseball America, and the National Collegiate Baseball Writers Association (NCBWA), after the 2016 season. Haseley was also a finalist for the John Olerud Award, which recognizes college baseball's best two-way player. After the 2016 season, he played collegiate summer baseball with the Orleans Firebirds of the Cape Cod Baseball League, where he was named a league all-star.

During his junior season, Haseley hit 14 home runs, had 56 runs batted in (RBI), and led the Atlantic Coast Conference (ACC) with a .390 batting average. He also walked (44) more times than he struck out (21). For his accomplishments, Haseley was named first-team all-American by Baseball America and the ABCA, and first-team all-ACC. He was again a finalist for the John Olerud Award.

== Professional career ==
=== Philadelphia Phillies ===
The Philadelphia Phillies selected Haseley with the eighth overall selection of the 2017 Major League Baseball draft. He signed with the Phillies on June 21, 2017, for a $5.1 million signing bonus. Haseley made his professional debut with the Rookie Gulf Coast League Phillies, batting in the third spot and going 3-for-4. After three games with the GCL Phillies, he was promoted to the Low–A Williamsport Crosscutters, with whom he batted .270/.350/.380 with two home runs, 18 RBIs, and five stolen bases in 137 at bats. He was once again promoted, this time to the Single–A Lakewood BlueClaws, where he batted .258/.315/.379 with one home run and six RBIs in 66 at bats.

Haseley began the 2018 season with the Clearwater Threshers of the High–A Florida State League, with whom he batted .300/.343/.415 with 5 triples (tied for 5th in the league), 5 home runs, 38 RBIs, and 7 steals in 330 at bats. Haseley was promoted to the Double-A Reading Fightin Phils, with whom in 136 at bats he hit .316/.403/.478 with 6 home runs and 17 RBIs. He was named an MiLB.com Phillies Organization All Star.

Haseley returned to Reading to begin his 2019 season, and in 165 at bats hit .267/.353/.485 with 8 home runs and 21 RBIs. Haseley was promoted to the Phillies' Triple-A affiliate, the Lehigh Valley IronPigs, on May 29, and with them hit .294/.377/.471 in 68 at bats.

The Phillies promoted Haseley to the major leagues on June 4, 2019, following an injury to Andrew McCutchen. He made his major league debut the same night, starting in center field and going 0-4 at the plate. The following day Haseley recorded his first career hit, a go-ahead RBI double in the 8th inning off Craig Stammen, and scored his first two career runs in a 7–5 victory over the Padres. With the Phillies in 2019 he batted .266/.324/.396, with five home runs and 26 RBIs in 222 at bats. He played 40 games in center field, 22 games in left field, and 10 games in right field, while pinch hitting three times and pinch running once.

Haseley played in 40 games for the Phillies in 2020, slashing .278/.348/.342 with no home runs and 13 RBIs in 79 at-bats. While competing for the starting center field job in 2021 Spring Training, Haseley suffered a moderate groin strain that would keep him out of action four weeks, and put him out of the job to begin the season. On April 14, 2021, the Phillies announced that Haseley would be stepping away from the team for an "undetermined amount of time" for personal reasons and placed him on the restricted list. The Phillies reinstated Haseley in July and optioned him to Lehigh Valley.

=== Chicago White Sox ===
On March 29, 2022, Haseley was traded to the Chicago White Sox in exchange for McKinley Moore. He was assigned to the Triple-A Charlotte Knights to begin the year. On April 22, the White Sox recalled Haseley from Triple-A. He appeared in 14 games for Chicago, going 5-for-21 with 3 walks. He spent the bulk of the year in Charlotte, playing in 110 games and hitting .239/.305/.412 with 15 home runs, 63 RBI, and 18 stolen bases. He was outrighted off the roster on November 4, 2022.

On April 16, 2023, Haseley was selected to the active roster. In 28 games for Chicago he batted .222/.282/.278 with no home runs, two RBI, and one stolen base. Following the season on November 28, Haseley was designated for assignment to create roster space for the newly–signed Paul DeJong. He elected free agency on November 30.
