= Lim Byeong-wuk =

South Korean baseball player (born 1995)

Byeong-wuk Lim

Kiwoom Heroes – No. 35
- Center fielder
- Born: September 30, 1995 (age 31)
- Bats: Left Throws: Right

KBO debut
- 2015, for the Nexen Heroes

KBO statistics (through May 30, 2024)
- Batting average: .260
- Home runs: 29
- Runs batted in: 177
- Stats at Baseball Reference

Teams
- Nexen/Kiwoom Heroes (2015–present)

- Lim Byeong-wuk
- Hangul: 임병욱
- Hanja: 林秉昱
- RR: Im Byeonguk
- MR: Im Pyŏnguk

Byeong-wuk Lim (Korean: 임병욱; born September 30, 1995) is a South Korean professional baseball center fielder currently playing for the Kiwoom Heroes of the KBO League.

Lim was a first-round draft pick in 2014 from Deoksugo with a signing bonus of 200 million South Korean won ($180,000) and an annual salary of 24 million won ($22,000) Lim played at shortstop in high school but switched to the outfield with Nexen. He wears number 0 because it resembles the Hangul jamo ㅇ which appears in his name three times.
