= 1909–10 VMI Keydets basketball team =

American college basketball season

1909–10 VMI Keydets men's basketball
- Conference: Independent
- Record: 2–5
- Head coach: F. J. Pratt (1st season)
- Home arena: Lexington Skating Rink

The 1909–10 VMI Keydets basketball team represented the Virginia Military Institute in their second ever season of basketball. The Keydets were coached by F. J. Pratt and held a 2–5 record by year's end. They played their games out of the Lexington Skating Rink.

== Schedule ==
Date time, TV	Opponent	Result	Record	Site city, state
January 15* no, no	Davidson	W 26–17	1–0	Lexington Skating Rink; Lexington, VA
February 12* no, no	Lynchburg YMCA	W 40–17	1–2	Lexington Skating Rink; Lexington, VA
February 12* no, no	Virginia Tech	W 37–14	1–3	Lexington Skating Rink; Lexington, VA
February 19* no, no	Staunton Military Academy	W 32–15	2–3	Lexington Skating Rink; Lexington, VA
February 21* no, no	at Staunton Military Academy	W 39–19	2–4	Staunton Skating Rink; Staunton, VA
February 22* no, no	at University of Virginia	W 56–21	2–5	Fayerweather Gymnasium; Charlottesville, VA
February 28* no, no	Virginia	W 22–17	1–1	Lexington Skating Rink; Lexington, VA
*Non-conference game. (#) Tournament seedings in parentheses.

== See also ==
- VMI Keydets
- VMI Keydets men's basketball
