= Henry Lannigan =

Welsh-American basketball coach (1863–1930)

Biographical details
- Born: December 17, 1863; Wales
- Died: December 24, 1930 (aged 67); Charlottesville, Virginia, U.S.

Coaching career (HC unless noted)

Basketball
- 1905–1929: Virginia

Baseball
- 1918: Virginia

Head coaching record
- Overall: 254–95–1 (basketball); 7–4 (baseball)

Accomplishments and honors

Championships
- Basketball; 1 SoCon regular season (1922)

Henry Hayden Lannigan (December 17, 1863 – December 24, 1930), known as Pop Lannigan, was a Welshman and immigrant to the United States who was the first head coach in Virginia Cavaliers basketball history from 1905 to 1929 and one of the "most noted athletic trainers in the East." He accumulated a dominant overall record of 254–95 (.728) over twenty-four seasons as the UVA head coach. During his tenure he also made the Cavalier track program nationally known while simultaneously starting the school's college basketball and college boxing programs. He came to Virginia after serving fourteen years as the Athletics Director of Cornell University.

Lannigan's ability was highly renowned throughout the eastern seaboard and southern United States, and his services were in high demand at many leading universities of both regions. Lannigan, however, remained loyal to the University of Virginia until he was forced into retirement by a severe illness to which he succumbed after several months.

== Coaching ==
Lannigan was a renowned college basketball coach in the early years of the sport. His team achieved a perfect record of 17–0 in the 1914–15 season, and posted an undefeated conference record in the old Southern Conference's inaugural year of 1921–22. In the 1924–25 season, his team nearly doubled up Kentucky, 29–16, after being invited to play against the Wildcats in their brand new Alumni Gymnasium. It was one of only 24 times the Kentucky team ever lost in that gym. Yet his Cavaliers defeated Kentucky again, 31–28, when they returned the favor to visit Memorial Gymnasium in 1928.

Lannigan earlier coached "the Arkansas Flash," James Rector, in track and field events. While still a UVA student, Rector fell just six inches short of winning the 100 meter dash of the 1908 Olympic Games in London, England. Rector was also a Virginia star on its college football and college baseball teams.

== Death ==
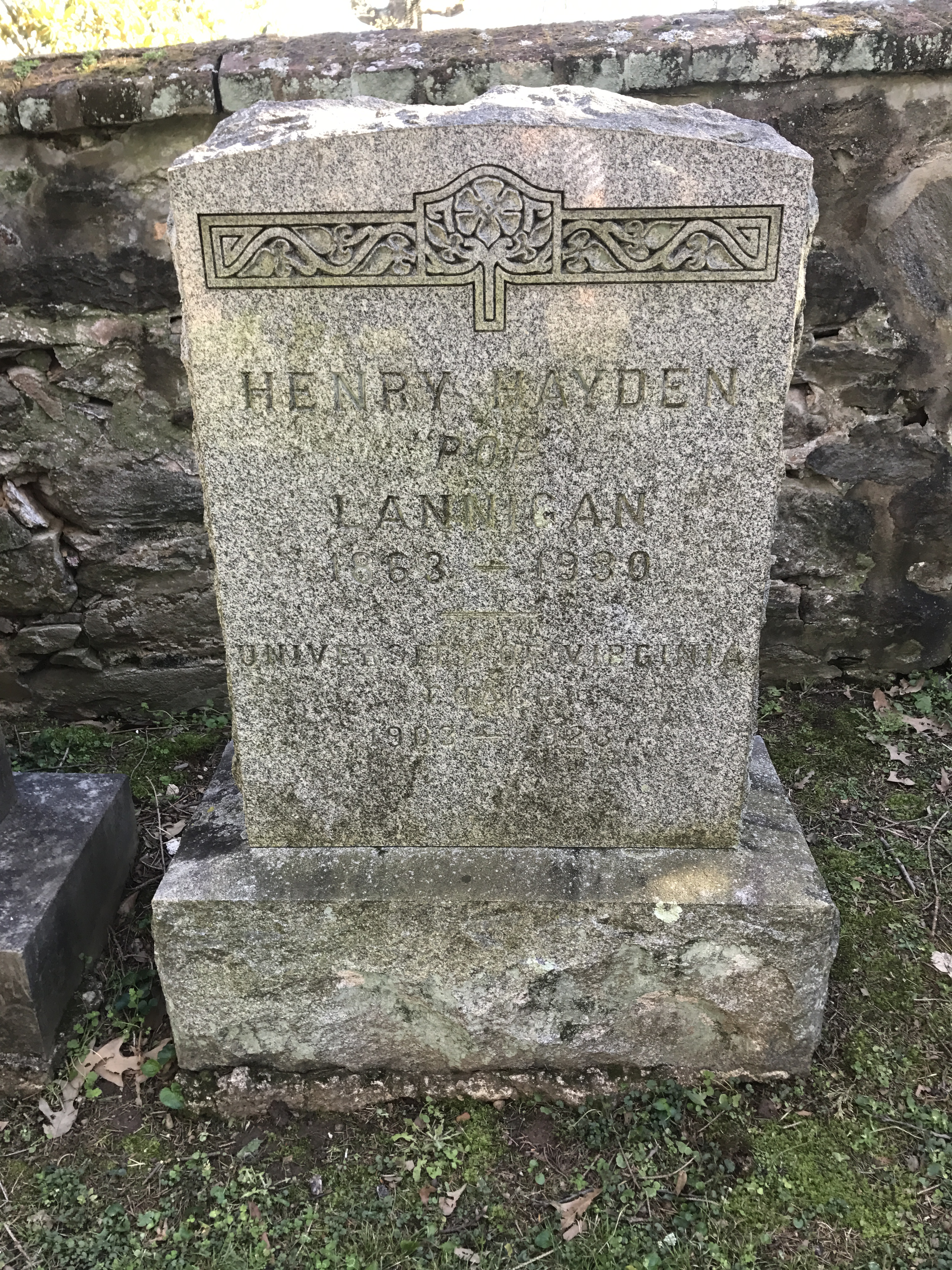
Lannigan's gravestone at the University of Virginia Cemetery in Charlottesville, Virginia.

Lannigan fell ill at the age of 65 and immediately retired from coaching. For many months he then underwent treatment at the United States Naval Hospital in Portsmouth, Virginia. For the last two months of his life he had returned to his home in Charlottesville and for his last week the University of Virginia Hospital. His funeral was held at St. Paul's Episcopal Church across the street from The Rotunda. Lannigan is buried in the University of Virginia Cemetery and Columbarium.

The current venue used by the Cavalier track and field teams, Lannigan Field, is named in his honor.

== Personal life ==
Lannigan married Ms. Helen White of Bakersfield, Vermont. He left behind two daughters, one who worked at the University of Virginia and one who lived in New York City. Henry was also survived by one son Raymond Angus Lannigan I from his first wife Sarah Dutton Lannigan. He was also survived by four brothers and a sister.
