= 1909–10 IAAUS men's basketball season =

Men's collegiate basketball season

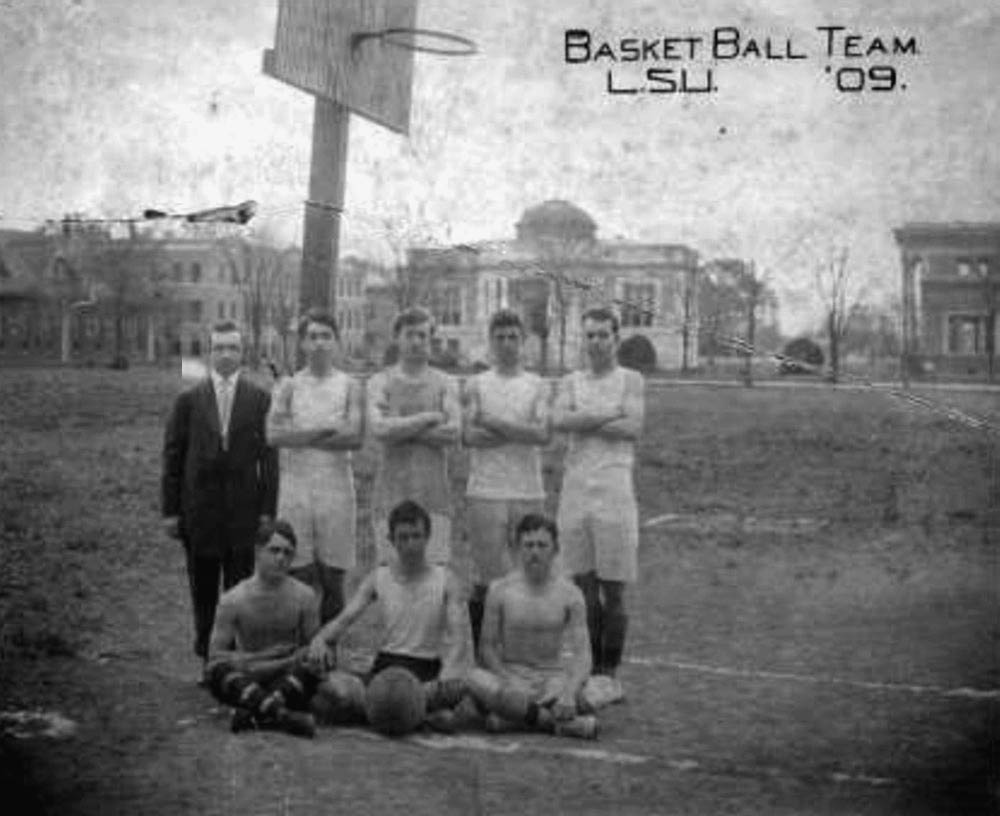
- The 1909–10 LSU team.
- Helms National Champions: Columbia (retroactive selection in 1943)
- Player of the Year (Helms): Harlan "Pat" Page, Chicago (retroactive selection in 1944)

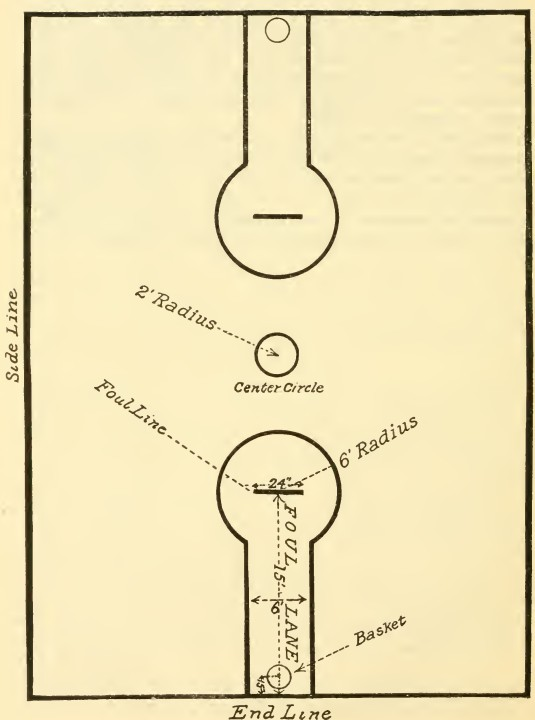
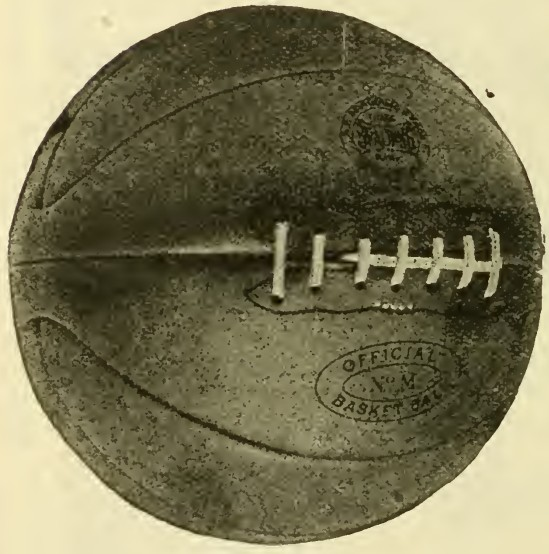
From Spalding's Official Collegiate Basket Ball Guide 1909–10. LEFT: A diagram of a regulation basketball court.
RIGHT: A regulation basketball.

The 1909–10 IAAUS men's basketball season began in December 1909, progressed through the regular season, and concluded in March 1910.

== Rule changes ==
- Continuous dribbling became legal; previously, a player could bounce the ball only once at a time, the bounce had to be higher than his head, and he had to recover the ball himself, in effect passing the ball to himself.
- The double dribble became illegal; previously, a player could make as many single-bounce dribbles as he wanted as long as he recovered the ball after each bounce (as if passing to himself each time).
- A player who dribbled the ball was allowed to shoot off the dribble for the first time; previously, a dribbler was not allowed to shoot the ball immediately after dribbling and had to pass it to someone else to shoot it.

== Season headlines ==
- The Intercollegiate Athletic Association of the United States (IAAUS) renamed itself the National Collegiate Athletic Association (NCAA) after the end of the season.
- The new rules allowing continuous dribbling rule and permitting a dribbler to shoot the ball off a dribble converted dribbling from a defensive tactic into a powerful offensive one.
- In February 1943, the Helms Athletic Foundation retroactively selected Columbia as its national champion for the 1909–10 season.
- In 1995, the Premo-Porretta Power Poll retroactively selected Williams as its top-ranked team for the 1909–10 season.

== Conference membership changes ==
School	Former Conference	New Conference
Denver Pioneers	Independent	No major basketball program
Harvard Crimson	Independent	No major basketball program

== Regular season ==
=== Conferences ===
==== Conference winners ====
Conference	Regular Season Winner	Conference Player of the Year	Conference Tournament	Tournament Venue (City)	Tournament Winner
Missouri Valley Intercollegiate Athletic Association	Iowa State (North); Kansas (South)	None selected	No Tournament; Kansas was conference champion		
Western Conference	Chicago	None selected	No Tournament		

==== Conference standings ====
1909–10 Missouri Valley Intercollegiate Athletic Association men's basketball standings
	Conf.				Overall
Team	W		L	PCT	W		L	PCT
North Division
Nebraska	6	–	2	.750	6	–	10	.375
Iowa State	6	–	2	.750	9	–	7	.563
Drake	0	–	8	.000	0	–	12	.000
South Division
Kansas†	7	–	1	.875	18	–	1	.947
Washington University	4	–	4	.500	7	–	5	.583
Missouri	1	–	7	.125	7	–	11	.389
† Conference championship winner

1909–10 Western Conference men's basketball standings
	Conf.				Overall
Team	W		L	PCT	W		L	PCT
Chicago	9	–	3	.750	10	–	3	.769
Minnesota	7	–	3	.700	10	–	3	.769
Wisconsin	7	–	5	.583	9	–	5	.643
Illinois	5	–	4	.556	5	–	4	.556
Purdue	5	–	5	.500	8	–	5	.615
Iowa	2	–	2	.500	11	–	3	.786
Indiana	3	–	7	.300	5	–	8	.385
Northwestern	0	–	9	.000	0	–	9	.000

=== Independents ===
A total of 115 college teams played as major independents. Among independents that played at least 10 games, Columbia (11–0), Virginia Tech (11–0), and Williams (11–0) were undefeated, and Southern California (21–3) finished with the most wins.

1909–10 IAAUS men's basketball independents standings
	Conf.				Overall
Team	W		L	PCT	W		L	PCT
Columbia		–		–	11	–	0	1.000
Oklahoma		–		–	8	–	0	1.000
Virginia Tech		–		–	11	–	0	1.000
Wake Forest		–		–	1	–	0	1.000
Washburn		–		–	4	–	0	1.000
Whittier		–		–	8	–	0	1.000
Williams		–		–	11	–	0	1.000
Army		–		–	14	–	1	.933
Southwestern (Kan.)		–		–	13	–	1	.929
Grinnell		–		–	12	–	1	.923
Cotner		–		–	11	–	1	.917
Ohio State		–		–	11	–	1	.917
Navy		–		–	10	–	1	.909
Rochester (N.Y.)		–		–	17	–	2	.895
Fordham		–		–	16	–	2	.889
Canisius		–		–	15	–	2	.882
Southern California		–		–	21	–	3	.875
Central University (Ky.)		–		–	20	–	3	.870
Utah		–		–	17	–	3	.850
North Dakota Agricultural		–		–	11	–	2	.846
Brigham Young		–		–	9	–	2	.818
Niagara		–		–	13	–	3	.813
Washington State		–		–	12	–	3	.800
Kansas State		–		–	11	–	3	.786
Oberlin		–		–	10	–	3	.769
Vanderbilt		–		–	10	–	3	.769
New York University		–		–	13	–	4	.765
Lehigh		–		–	6	–	2	.750
LSU		–		–	3	–	1	.750
Seton Hall		–		–	6	–	2	.750
St. John's (N.Y.)		–		–	15	–	5	.750
Swarthmore		–		–	9	–	3	.750
Virginia		–		–	12	–	4	.750
Allegheny		–		–	8	–	3	.727
Notre Dame		–		–	10	–	4	.714
Marietta		–		–	7	–	3	.700
Washington		–		–	14	–	6	.700
Georgia		–		–	2	–	1	.667
Michigan State		–		–	10	–	5	.667
Montana State		–		–	6	–	3	.667
Rhode Island State		–		–	6	–	3	.667
Wisconsin–Stevens Point		–		–	2	–	1	.667
Auburn		–		–	11	–	6	.647
Colgate		–		–	9	–	5	.643
Wesleyan (Conn.)		–		–	9	–	5	.643
Wooster		–		–	7	–	4	.636
Akron		–		–	5	–	3	.625
St. Joseph's		–		–	5	–	3	.625
Baylor		–		–	8	–	5	.615
Illinois State		–		–	8	–	5	.615
Cincinnati		–		–	3	–	2	.600
CCNY		–		–	6	–	4	.600
Dartmouth		–		–	6	–	4	.600
Maine		–		–	6	–	4	.600
Miami (Ohio)		–		–	6	–	4	.600
Bloomsburg		–		–	7	–	5	.583
Bucknell		–		–	7	–	5	.583
Colorado		–		–	7	–	5	.583
Grove City		–		–	7	–	5	.583
Wabash		–		–	7	–	5	.583
Millikin		–		–	4	–	3	.571
Penn State		–		–	8	–	6	.571
Oregon Agricultural		–		–	7	–	3	.700
SUNY-Potsdam		–		–	11	–	9	.550
Cornell		–		–	7	–	6	.538
Princeton		–		–	7	–	6	.538
Pennsylvania		–		–	11	–	10	.524
Arizona		–		–	2	–	2	.500
Delaware		–		–	6	–	6	.500
Trinity (N.C.)		–		–	4	–	4	.500
Kalamazoo		–		–	2	–	2	.500
Oklahoma A&M		–		–	3	–	3	.500
Butler		–		–	3	–	4	.429
Saint Mary's (Calif.)		–		–	1	–	1	.500
Washington and Lee		–		–	6	–	6	.500
Wyoming		–		–	3	–	3	.500
Idaho		–		–	8	–	9	.471
Tennessee		–		–	7	–	8	.467
Bradley		–		–	6	–	7	.462
Denison		–		–	6	–	7	.462
Texas		–		–	6	–	7	.462
Dayton		–		–	5	–	6	.455
Gettysburg		–		–	5	–	6	.455
Mount Union		–		–	8	–	10	.444
Tulane		–		–	3	–	4	.429
Georgetown		–		–	5	–	7	.417
Davidson		–		–	2	–	3	.400
Detroit		–		–	2	–	3	.400
New Mexico		–		–	2	–	3	.400
North Dakota		–		–	4	–	6	.400
Temple		–		–	4	–	6	.400
New Mexico A&M		–		–	3	–	5	.375
Brown		–		–	5	–	9	.357
Colorado Agricultural		–		–	1	–	2	.333
Franklin		–		–	3	–	6	.333
Kentucky		–		–	4	–	8	.333
Lake Forest		–		–	3	–	6	.333
Manhattan		–		–	7	–	15	.318
Springfield (Mass.)		–		–	3	–	7	.300
Union (N.Y.)		–		–	3	–	7	.300
Utah State		–		–	3	–	7	.300
Nebraska Wesleyan		–		–	4	–	10	.286
Ohio		–		–	8	–	11	.421
Trinity (Conn.)		–		–	4	–	10	.286
VMI		–		–	2	–	5	.286
Yale		–		–	4	–	11	.267
William & Mary		–		–	8	–	11	.421
Fairmount		–		–	3	–	10	.231
Syracuse		–		–	3	–	11	.214
Carleton		–		–	1	–	4	.200
Indiana State		–		–	2	–	9	.182
Oregon		–		–	1	–	5	.167
Ole Miss		–		–	0	–	7	.000
Santa Clara		–		–	0	–	5	.000
South Carolina		–		–	0	–	1	.000
Rankings from AP Poll

== Awards ==
=== Helms College Basketball All-Americans ===
The practice of selecting a Consensus All-American Team did not begin until the 1928–29 season. The Helms Athletic Foundation later retroactively selected a list of All-Americans for the 1909–10 season.

Player	Team
William Broadhead	NYU
Leon Campbell	Colgate
Dave Charters	Purdue
William Copthorne	Army
Charles Eberle	Swarthmore
Samuel Harman	Rochester
Ted Kiendl	Columbia
Ernest Lambert	Oklahoma
W. Vaughn Lewis	Williams
Harlan "Pat" Page	Chicago

=== Major player of the year awards ===
- Helms Player of the Year: Harlan "Pat" Page, Chicago (retroactive selection in 1944)

== Coaching changes ==
A number of teams changed coaches during the season and after it ended.

Team	Former Coach	Interim Coach	New Coach	Reason
Akron	Clarence Weed		Frank Haggerty	
Baylor	Enoch J. Mills		Ralph Glaze	
Brown	Walter White		J. Russell McKay	
Butler	Walter Gipe		Bill Diddle	
BYU	Fred Bennion		Henry Rose	Bennion left to coach at Utah.
Cincinnati	C. A. Shroetter		Russ Easton	
Colorado Agricultural	Claude Rothgeb		George Cassidy	
Cornell	David Coogan		Paul Sternberg	
Dartmouth	Benjamin Lang		Tom Keady	
Drake	John L. Griffith		A. R. Hackett	
Georgia	C. O. Heildler		W. A. Cunningham	
Idaho	John S. Grogan		John G. Griffith	
Illinois	Herb Juul		Thomas E. Thompson	
Illinois State	George Binnewies		Harrison Russell	
Indiana	John Georgen		Oscar Rackle	
Iowa	John G. Griffith		Walter Stewart	
Michigan State	Chester Brewer		John Macklin	Brewer left to coach at Missouri.
Missouri	Guy Lowman		Chester Brewer	
Navy	Billy Lush		Bernard Willis	Lush left for Yale.
Nebraska	T. J. Hewitt		Osmond F. Field	
New Mexico Agricultural	George Lain		Art Badenoch	
Niagara	Claude Allen		Alfred Heerdt	
Northwestern	Louis Gillesby		Stuart Templeton	
Oregon Agricultural	E. D. Angell		Clifford Reed	Angell left to coach at Milwaukee Normal School
Rhode Island State	Phil Wessels		George Cobb	
Saint Joseph's	John Dever		Edward Bennis	
Saint Mary's (CA)	Frank Boek		Otto Rittler	
Seton Hall	Dick McDonough		Jim Flanagan	
St. John's	Harry A. Fisher		Claude Allen	
Utah	Robert Richardson		Fred Bennion	
Vanderbilt	R. B. McGehee		Zeke Martin	
VMI	F. J. Pratt		J. Mitchell	
