= List of DePaul Blue Demons men's basketball head coaches =

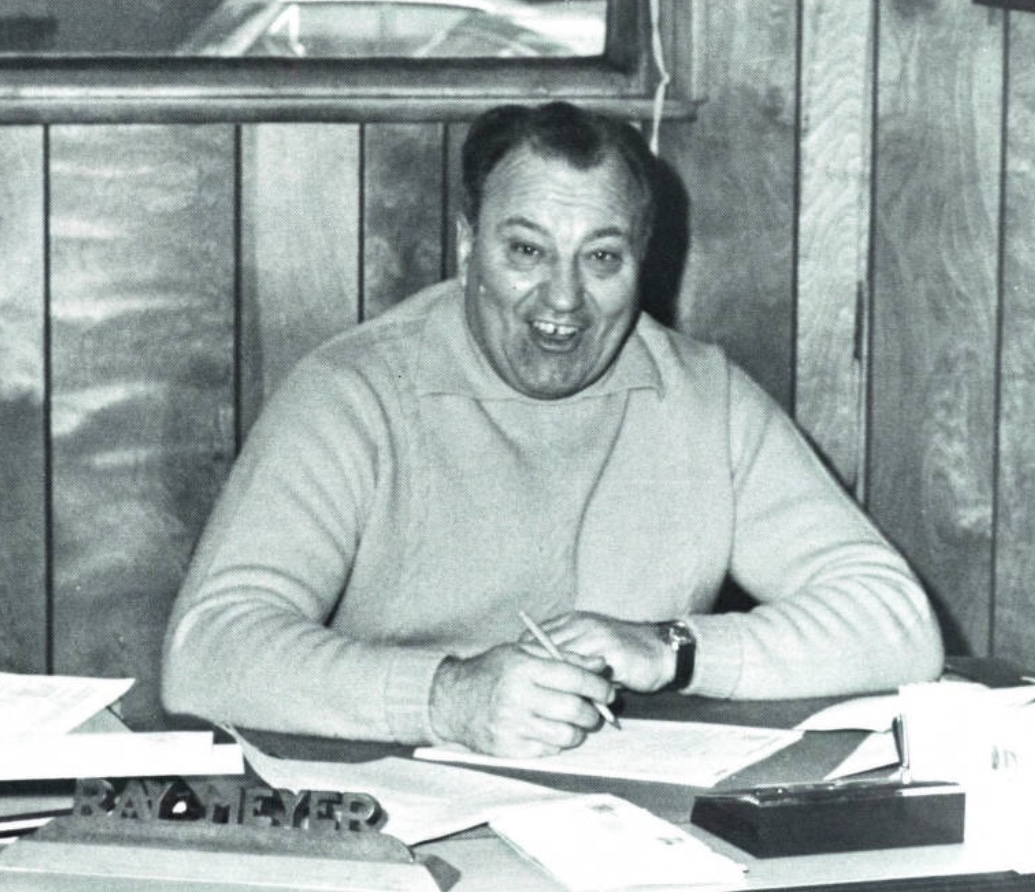
Ray Meyer, the winningest head coach in Blue Demons men's basketball history.

The following is a list of DePaul Blue Demons men's basketball head coaches. There have been 16 head coaches of the Blue Demons in their 100-season history.

DePaul's current head coach is Tony Stubblefield. He was hired as the Blue Demons' head coach in April 2021, replacing Dave Leitao, who was fired after the 2020–21 season.

No.	Tenure	Coach	Years	Record	Pct.
1	1923–1924	Robert Stevenson	1	8–6	.571
2	1924–1925	Harry Adams	1	6–13	.316
3	1925–1929	Eddie Anderson	4	25–23	.521
4	1929–1936	Jim Kelly	7	99–22	.818
5	1936–1940	Tom Haggerty	4	64–29	.688
6	1940–1942	Bill Wendt	2	23–20	.535
7	1942–1984	Ray Meyer	42	724–354	.672
8	1984–1997	Joey Meyer	13	231–158	.594
9	1997–2002	Pat Kennedy	5	67–85	.441
10	2002–2005; 2015–2021 (Note: Leitao was suspended for the first three games of the 2019–20 season. DePaul's 3-0 record in these games is not credited to any coach.)	Dave Leitao	9	124–146	.459
11	2005–Jan 2010 (Note: Wainwright was fired on January 11, 2010. Webster was named interim coach for the remainder of the season.)	Jerry Wainwright	5	59–80	.424
12	2010*	Tracy Webster	N/A	1–15	.063
13	2010–2015	Oliver Purnell	5	54–105	.340
14	2021–Jan, 2024	Tony Stubblefield	3	28–54	.341
15	2024*	Matt Brady	N/A	0–14	.000
16	2024–present	Chris Holtmann	2	14–20	.412
Totals		16 coaches	100 seasons	1,507–1,108	.576
Records updated through end of 2023–24 season * - Denotes interim head coach. Source
