= List of DePaul Blue Demons men's basketball seasons =

This is a list of seasons completed by the DePaul Blue Demons men's college basketball team.

== Seasons ==
Statistics overview
Season	Coach	Overall	Conference	Standing	Postseason
Independent (1923–1991)
1923–24	Robert L. Stevenson	8–6			
1924–25	Harry Adams	6–13			
1925–26	Eddie Anderson	11–5			
1926–27	Eddie Anderson	7–7			
1927–28	Eddie Anderson	2–7			
1928–29	Eddie Anderson	5–4			
1929–30	Jim Kelly	15–5			
1930–31	Jim Kelly	13–3			
1931–32	Jim Kelly	9–6			
1932–33	Jim Kelly	12–3			
1933–34	Jim Kelly	17–0			
1934–35	Jim Kelly	15–1			
1935–36	Jim Kelly	18–4			
1936–37	Tom Haggerty	15–6			
1937–38	Tom Haggerty	12–10			
1938–39	Tom Haggerty	15–7			
1939–40	Tom Haggerty	22–6			NIT Fourth Place
1940–41	Bill Wendt	13–8			
1941–42	Bill Wendt	10–12			
1942–43	Ray Meyer	19–5			NCAA Semifinals
1943–44	Ray Meyer	22–4			NIT Runner-up
1944–45	Ray Meyer	21–3			NIT Champions
1945–46	Ray Meyer	19–5			
1946–47	Ray Meyer	16–9			
1947–48	Ray Meyer	22–8			NIT Fourth Place
1948–49	Ray Meyer	16–9			
1949–50	Ray Meyer	12–13			
1950–51	Ray Meyer	13–12			
1951–52	Ray Meyer	19–8			
1952–53	Ray Meyer	19–9			NCAA Round of 16
1953–54	Ray Meyer	11–10			
1954–55	Ray Meyer	16–6			
1955–56	Ray Meyer	16–8			NCAA First Round
1956–57	Ray Meyer	8–14			
1957–58	Ray Meyer	8–12			
1958–59	Ray Meyer	13–11			NCAA University Division Round of 16
1959–60	Ray Meyer	17–7			NCAA University Division Round of 16
1960–61	Ray Meyer	17–8			NIT First Round
1961–62	Ray Meyer	13–10			
1962–63	Ray Meyer	15–8			NIT First Round
1963–64	Ray Meyer	21–4			NIT Quarterfinals
1964–65	Ray Meyer	17–10			NCAA University Division Round of 16
1965–66	Ray Meyer	18–8			NIT First Round
1966–67	Ray Meyer	17–8			
1967–68	Ray Meyer	13–12			
1968–69	Ray Meyer	14–11			
1969–70	Ray Meyer	12–13			
1970–71	Ray Meyer	8–17			
1971–72	Ray Meyer	12–11			
1972–73	Ray Meyer	14–11			
1973–74	Ray Meyer	16–9			
1974–75	Ray Meyer	15–10			
1975–76	Ray Meyer	20–9			NCAA Division I Round of 16
1976–77	Ray Meyer	15–12			
1977–78	Ray Meyer	27–3			NCAA Division I Quarterfinals
1978–79	Ray Meyer	26–6			NCAA Division I Third Place
1979–80	Ray Meyer	26–2			NCAA Division I Round of 32
1980–81	Ray Meyer	27–2			NCAA Division I Round of 32
1981–82	Ray Meyer	26–2			NCAA Division I Round of 32
1982–83	Ray Meyer	21–12			NIT Runner-up
1983–84	Ray Meyer	27–3			NCAA Division I Round of 16
1984–85	Joey Meyer	19–10			NCAA Division I Round of 64
1985–86	Joey Meyer	18–13			NCAA Division I Round of 16
1986–87	Joey Meyer	28–3			NCAA Division I Round of 16
1987–88	Joey Meyer	22–8			NCAA Division I Round of 32
1988–89	Joey Meyer	21–12			NCAA Division I Round of 32
1989–90	Joey Meyer	20–15			NIT Quarterfinals
1990–91	Joey Meyer	20–9			NCAA Division I Round of 64
Great Midwest Conference (1991–1995)
1991–92	Joey Meyer	20–9	8–2	1st	NCAA Division I Round of 64
1992–93	Joey Meyer	16–15	3–7	5th	
1993–94	Joey Meyer	16–12	4–8	5th	NIT First Round
1994–95	Joey Meyer	17–11	6–6	5th	NIT First Round
Conference USA (1995–2005)
1995–96	Joey Meyer	11–18	2–12	10th	
1996–97	Joey Meyer	3–23	1–13	12th/Last	
1997–98	Pat Kennedy	7–23	3–13	10th	
1998–99	Pat Kennedy	18–13	10–6	6th	NIT Second Round
1999–00	Pat Kennedy	21–12	9–7	3rd	NCAA Division I Round of 64
2000–01	Pat Kennedy	12–18	4–12	11th	
2001–02	Pat Kennedy	9–19	2–14	14th/Last	
2002–03	Dave Leitao	16–13	8–8	7th	NIT First Round
2003–04	Dave Leitao	22–10	12–4	1st	NCAA Division I Round of 32
2004–05	Dave Leitao	20–11	10–6	5th	NIT Second Round
Big East Conference (original) (2005–2013)
2005–06	Jerry Wainwright	12–15	5–11	T–13th	
2006–07	Jerry Wainwright	20–14	9–7	8th	NIT Quarterfinals
2007–08	Jerry Wainwright	11–19	6–12	13th	
2008–09	Jerry Wainwright	9–24	0–18	16th/Last	
2009–10	Jerry Wainwright (7–8)/Tracy Webster (1–15)	8–23	1–17	16th/Last	
2010–11	Oliver Purnell	7–24	1–17	16th/Last	
2011–12	Oliver Purnell	12–19	3–15	16th/Last	
2012–13	Oliver Purnell	11–21	2–16	15th/Last	
Big East Conference (2013–present)
2013–14	Oliver Purnell	12–21	3–15	10th/Last	
2014–15	Oliver Purnell	12–20	6–12	7th	
2015–16	Dave Leitao	9–22	3–15	9th	
2016–17	Dave Leitao	9–23	2–16	10th/Last	
2017–18	Dave Leitao	11–20	4–14	T–9/Last	
2018–19	Dave Leitao	19–17	7–11	T–8/Last	CBI Runner-up
2019–20	Dave Leitao	16–16	3–15	10th/Last	No postseason held
2020–21	Dave Leitao	5–14	2–13	11th/Last	
2021–22	Tony Stubblefield	15–16	6–14	9th	
2022–23	Tony Stubblefield	10–23	3–17	10th	
2023–24	Tony Stubblefield (3–15)/Matt Brady (0–14)	3–29	0–20	11th/Last	
2024–25	Chris Holtmann	14–20	4–16	10th	CBC First Round
2025–26	Chris Holtmann	16–16	8–12	6th	
Total:		1533–1140 (.574)			
National champion Postseason invitational champion Conference regular season champion Conference regular season and conference tournament champion Division regular season champion Division regular season and conference tournament champion Conference tournament champion
