= 1927 DePaul Blue Demons football team =

American college football season

1927 DePaul Blue Demons football
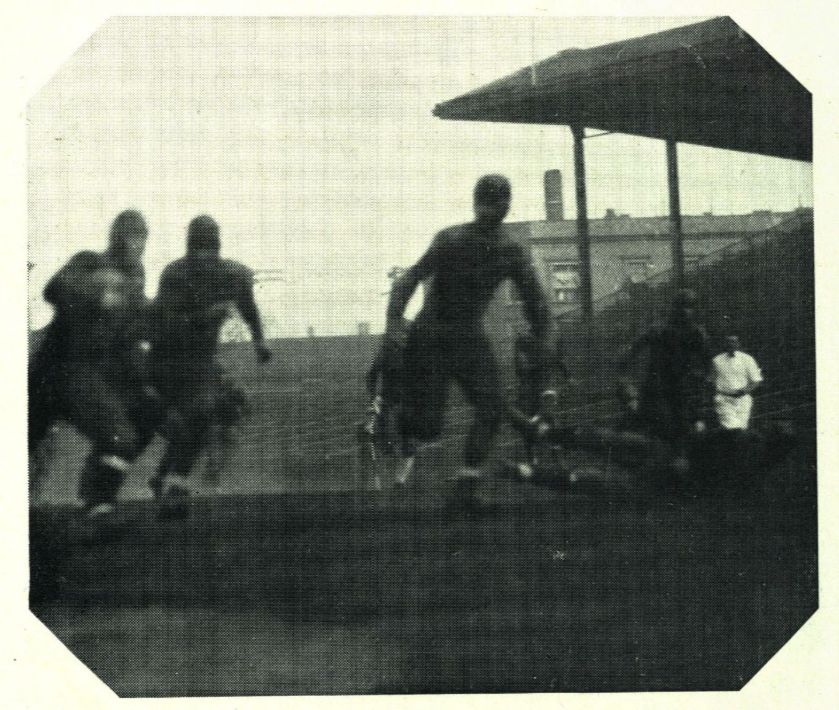
- DePaul acquired their only victory of the season against Loyola on October 29th at Wrigley Field.
- Conference: Western Interstate Conference
- Record: 1–5–1 (0–1–1 WIC)
- Head coach: Eddie Anderson (3rd season)
- Home stadium: DePaul Field, Wrigley Field

The 1927 DePaul Blue Demons football team was an American football team that represented DePaul University as an independent during the 1927 college football season. In its third season under head coach Eddie Anderson, the team compiled a 1–5–1 record and was outscored by a total of 171 to 57.

== Schedule ==
Date	Opponent	Site	Result	Attendance	Source
October 1	St. Viator	DePaul Field; Chicago, IL	L 0–19		
October 8	Columbia (IA)	DePaul Field; Chicago, IL	T 14–14		
October 15	Tulsa*	Wrigley Field; Chicago, IL	L 6–30	5,000	
October 29	Loyola (IL)*	Wrigley Field; Chicago, IL	W 12–6		
November 5	at Niagara*	Niagara Field; Niagara Falls, NY	L 13–41	15,000	
November 12	Saint Mary's (MN)*	Chicago, IL	L 6–40		
November 24	North Dakota Agricultural*	Wrigley Field; Chicago, IL	L 6–21		
*Non-conference game
