= DePaul Blue Demons football =

American college football team

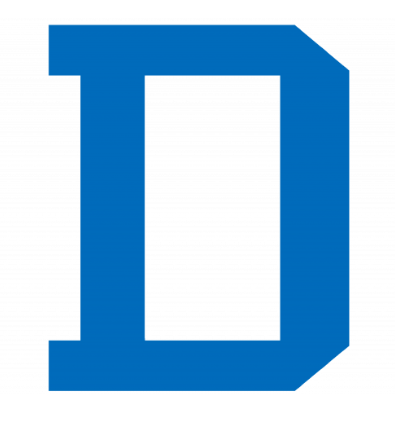
- DePaul Athletic's logo 1908–1978
- First season: 1898
- Last season: 1938; 88 years ago
- Location: Chicago, Illinois
- Field: DePaul Field
- Colors: Royal Blue and Scarlet
- All-time record: 100–93–17* (.517)

National championships
- Claimed: 0
- Unclaimed: 0

Conference championships
- 2

Division championships
- 0

The DePaul Blue Demons football program represented DePaul University in the sport of college football. The university fielded an intercollegiate squad from 1898 to 1938.

== History ==
The team played home games at a variety of venues including DePaul Field, Loyola Stadium, Mills Stadium, Comiskey Park, Wrigley Field, and Soldier Field. DePaul Field (formally St. Vincent Field) was located just north of the St. Vincent de Paul Church from 1898 until 1955. The first season with a complete record is the 1907 St. Vincent's team, the final year before the institution became DePaul University and the athletic teams became the "D-Men". The name would then officially be changed to the Blue Demons in 1922. They played in the short-lived Western Interstate Conference from 1923 to 1927. They were conference champions in both 1925 and 1926. The team went undefeated in 1908 and 1933, outscoring opponents 177-34 and 119-12 respectively.

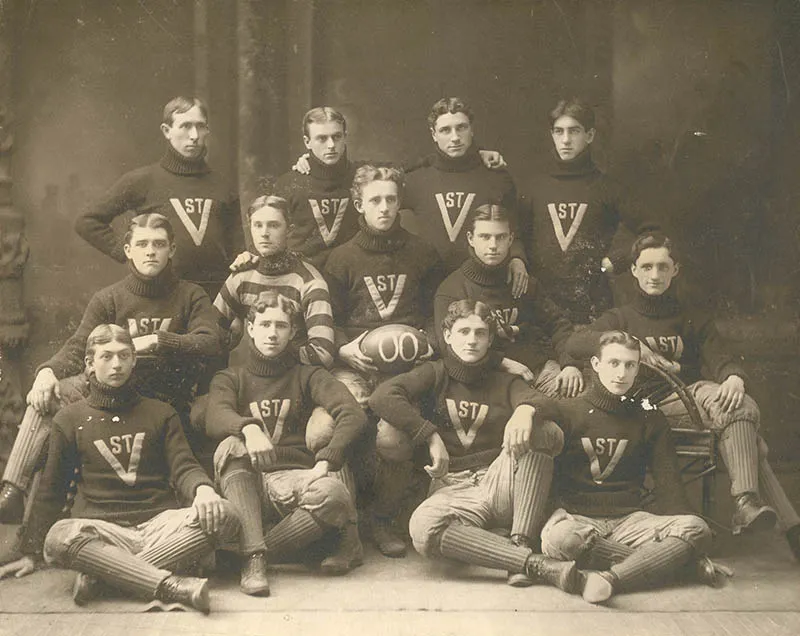
1900 St. Vincent's football team

The statistics surrounding the program are largely incomplete due to so few records being kept in the early years. Made even more confusing by the fact that many of the St. Vincent's College (1898–1907) games were being played against high school teams that kept little to no statistics. The DePaul University Academy, operating from 1898 to 1968, also fielded a (high school-level) football team from 1913 to 1965. Winning 12 Chicago Catholic League titles. Alumni include 1942 NFL Champion Steve Juzwik and Chicago Cardinals End Dick Evans.

In December 1938, then-president Michael O’Connell stated that the university would be leaving the grid due to a “lack of sufficient interest to justify the cost of the football program.” It is largely believed that the program was cut due to a lack of student enrollment and funding brought on by the Great Depression.

== Results ==
An article by Cam Rodriguez claims that from 1901 to 1938 that the university team went around 100–93–17 overall. This is uncertain pending new records being discovered. Despite the school no longer having a football team, they made a lasting mark on the sport. Producing players such as 1940 NFL Champion Chet Chesney and offensive lineman Dick Stahlman. Who would play in the NFL and AFL for 10 seasons, placing at the top of NFL in 1927, 1931, and winning the first NFL Championship Game in 1933.

DePaul Field was partially built over by Alumni Hall starting in 1955 before being demolished in 2000. Replaced by the current Lincoln Park Student Center in January, 2002 at 2250 N Sheffield Avenue as well as a parking lot that serves St. Vincent's Church.

== Seasons ==
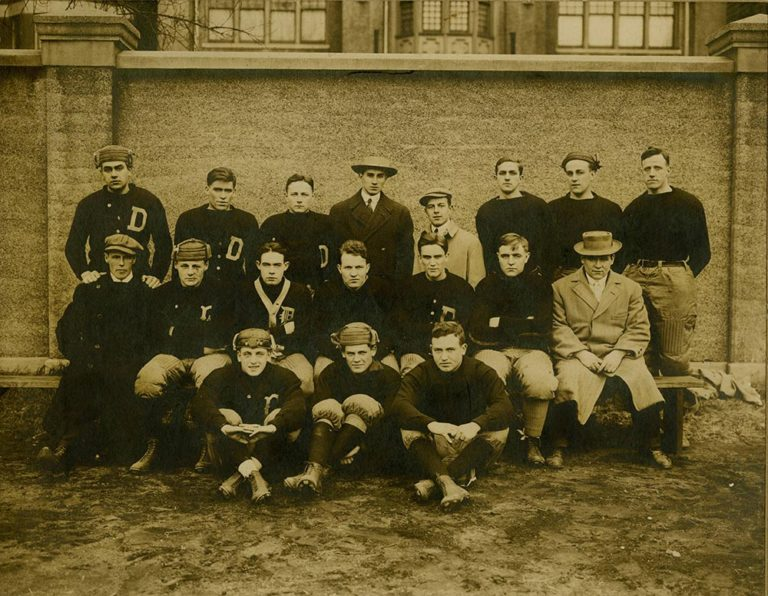
1912 DePaul D-Men

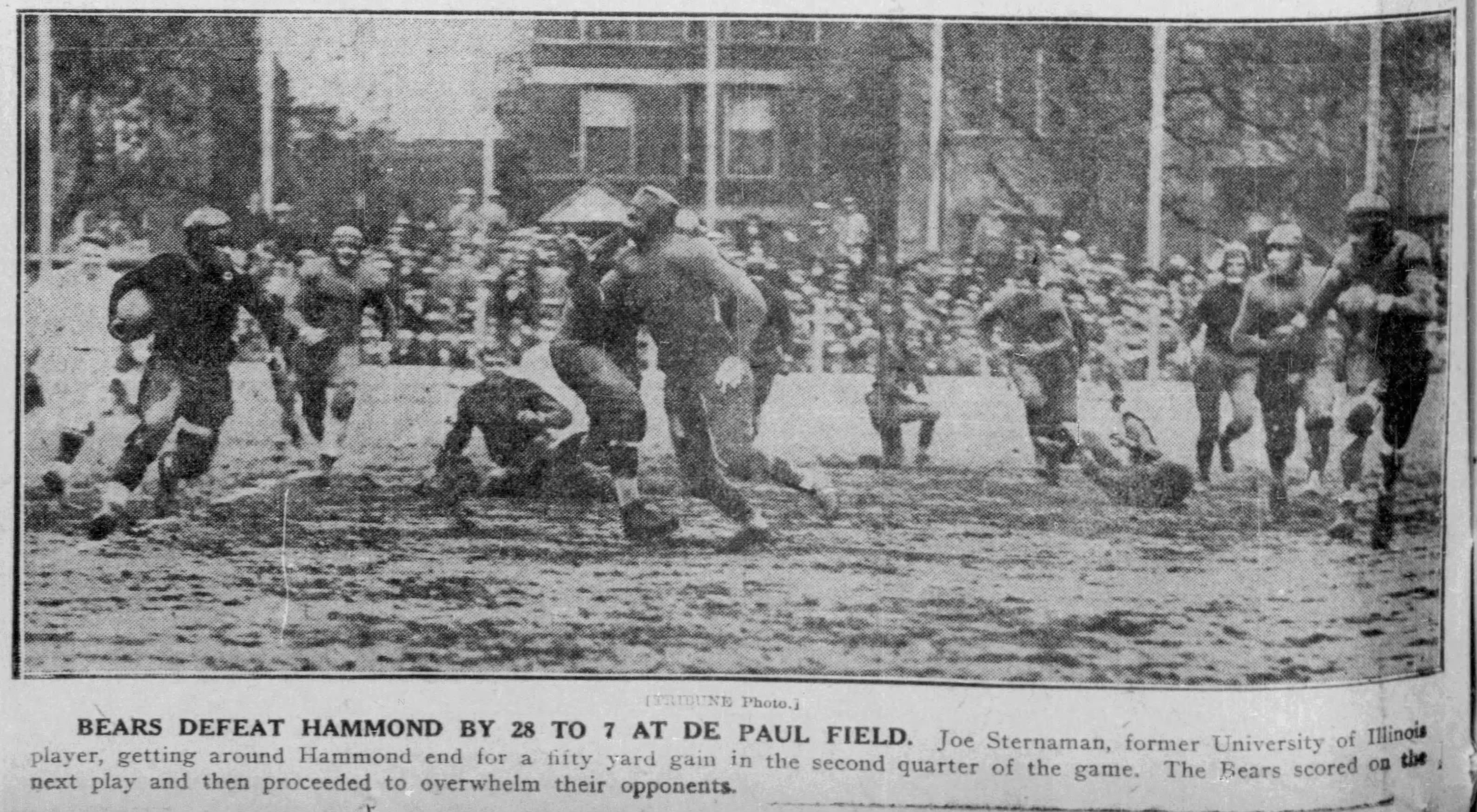
The Chicago Bears played a single game at DePaul Field on October 11, 1925, defeating the Hammond Pros 28–7.

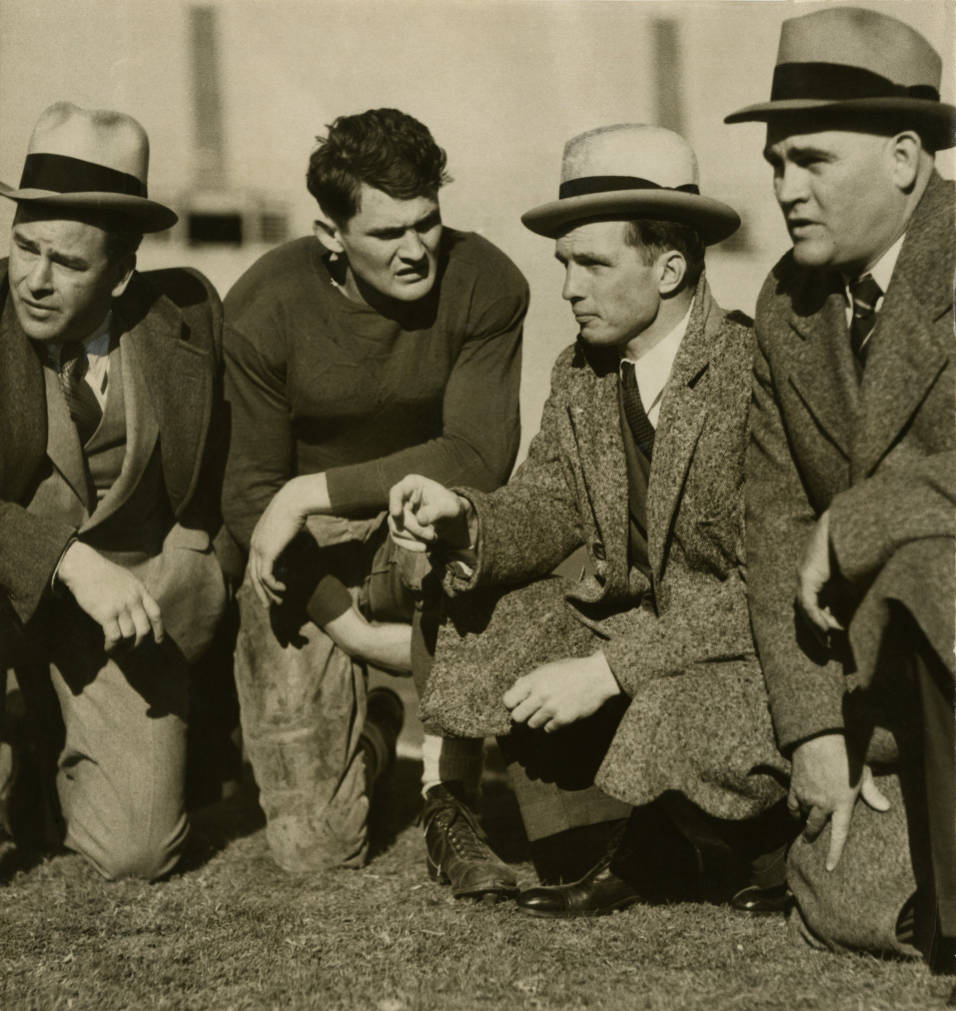
Left to right: Assistant Coach Ben Connors; Capt. Art McClane, Coach Eddie Anderson, Athletic Director J. D. Kelly. 1931

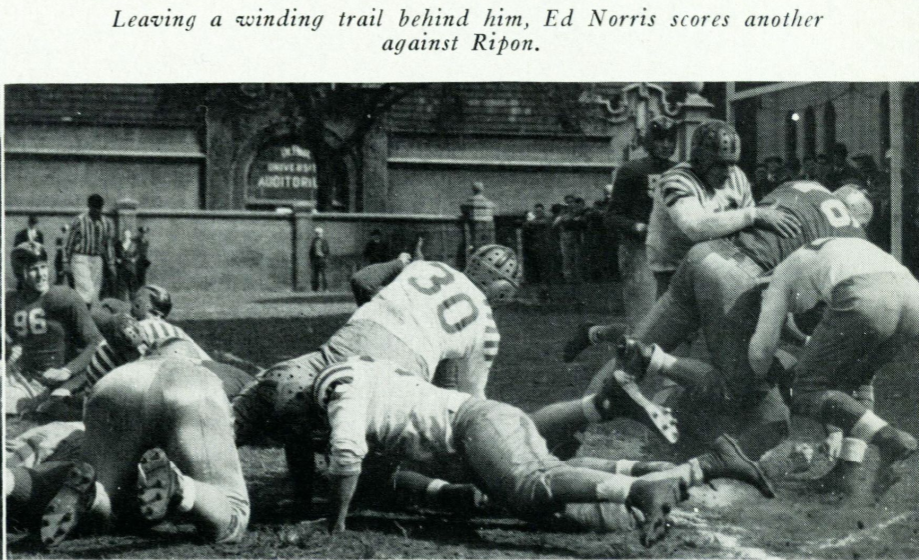
The Blue Demons defeat Ripon 38–0 for the programs' final game at DePaul Field, on September 24, 1938. "The Barn" can be seen in the background.

Year	Coach	Overall	Conference	Standing	Bowl/playoffs
St. Vincent's (IL) (Independent) (1898–1907)
1898	Unknown				
1899	Unknown	≈0–2			
1900	Unknown	≈0–1			
1901	Unknown	≈1–0			
1902	Unknown				
1903	Unknown				
1904	Unknown				
1905	Unknown				
1906	Unknown				
1907	Frank Haggerty	5–2			
DePaul "D-Men" (Independent) (1908–1921)
1908	Frank Haggerty	7–0–1			
1909	Frank Haggerty	≈0–3			
1910	Unknown				
1911	Unknown	≈1–1			
1912	Unknown	4–2–1			
1913	Unknown	2–2			
1914	Unknown				
1915	Unknown	1–2			
1916	Unknown	2–4			
1917	No team, World War I				
1918	No team, World War I				
1919	Unknown				
1920	Unknown				
1921	Frank Haggerty	0–1			
DePaul Blue Demons (Independent) (1922)
1922	Frank Haggerty	0–3			
DePaul Blue Demons (Western Interstate Conference) (1923–1927)
1923	Frank Haggerty & Robert Stevenson	3–4			
1924	Harry Adams	5–4–1	0–1–0	6th	
1925	Eddie Anderson	4–2–1	2–1–1	1st	
1926	Eddie Anderson	3–3	2–1	1st	
1927	Eddie Anderson	1–5–1	0–1–1	?	
DePaul Blue Demons (Independent) (1928–1938)
1928	Eddie Anderson	4–4–1			
1929	Eddie Anderson	2–5			
1930	Eddie Anderson	4–2–1			
1931	Eddie Anderson	6–3			
1932	Jim Kelly	5–1–2			
1933	Jim Kelly	6–0–1			
1934	Jim Kelly	4–3			
1935	Jim Kelly & Ben Connor	5–2–1			
1936	Jim Kelly & Ben Connor	7–2			
1937	Ben Connor	7–2			
1938	Ben Connor	2–7			
Total:		91–69–11			

== Resurgence ==
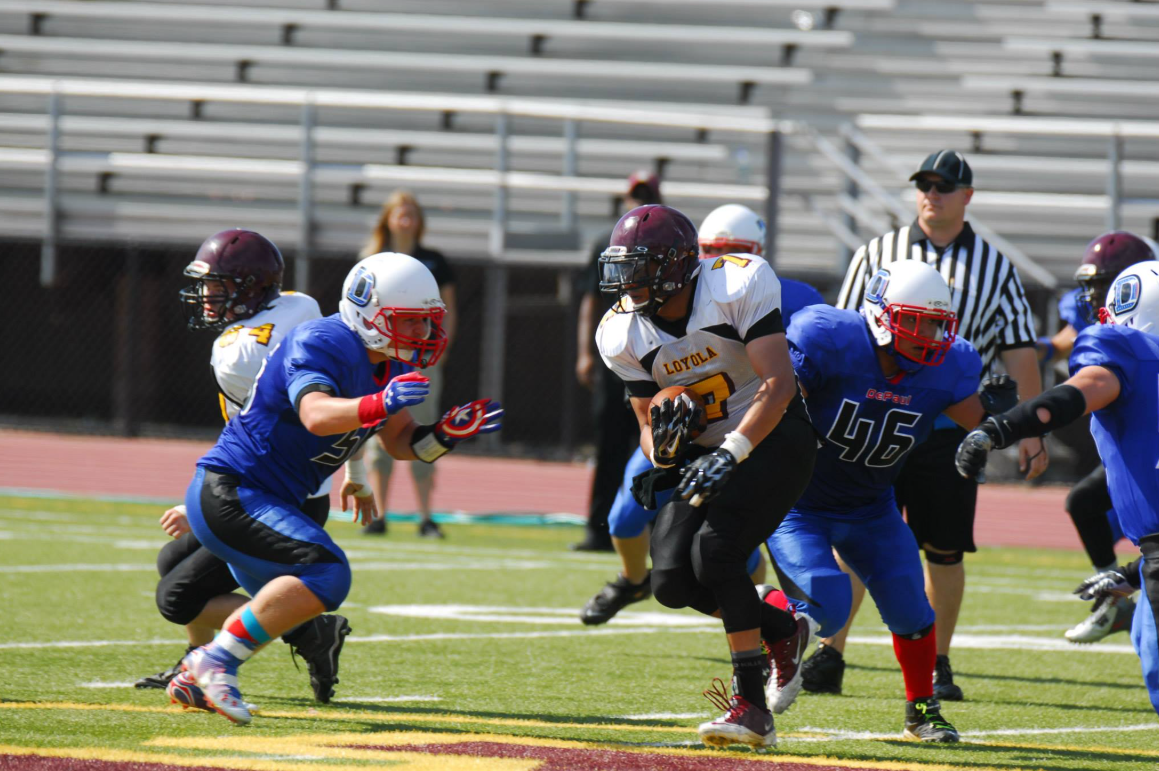
Club football vs. Loyola Chicago at Hoyne Field in West Ridge, 2014.

Following the demise of the varsity squad, the university would host sporadic intramural teams. Peaking in popularity in the 1970s and 80s. The DePaul Club Football team would very briefly play from 2013 to 2015. However, the team would face multiple problems. Mostly surrounding funding and a place to play and practice as the team was independent from DePaul Athletics. Despite playing a handful of games, and even briefly having access to Main Stadium at Benedictine University in Lisle, the club was soon disbanded. The team was confirmed to have played two other clubs, Loyola University and SIU Edwardsville.

The DePaul Flag Football Club was formed in 2022 and has sinced played multiple neighboring universities. Most of the practices occcur at Maradona Field by Diversey Harbor.

== See also ==
- DePaul Blue Demons
