= 1925 DePaul Blue Demons football team =

American college football season

1925 DePaul Blue Demons football
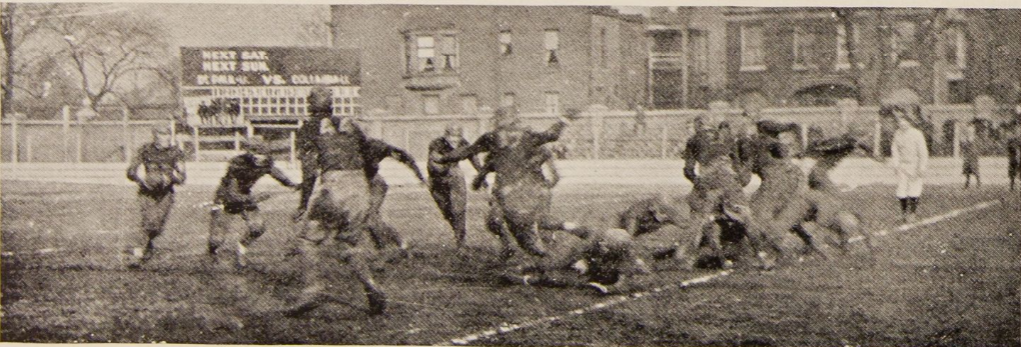
- DePaul's victory over Columbia (IA) on October 24, 1925.

WIC champion
- Conference: Western Interstate Conference
- Record: 4–2–1 (2–1–1 WIC)
- Head coach: Eddie Anderson (1st season)

1925 Western Interstate Conference football standings
	Conf.					Overall
Team	W		L		T	W		L		T
Lombard	1	–	0	–	0	3	–	5	–	0
Columbia (IA)	3	–	1	–	1	4	–	3	–	1
DePaul	2	–	1	–	1	4	–	2	–	1
St. Viator	2	–	1	–	1	5	–	3	–	1
Luther	1	–	1	–	0	3	–	4	–	0
La Crosse Normal	0	–	2	–	1	1	–	4	–	2
Valparaiso	0	–	3	–	0	1	–	6	–	0

The 1925 DePaul Blue Demons football team was an American football team that represented DePaul University as a member of the Western Interstate Conference (WIC) during the 1925 college football season. The team compiled a 4–2–1 record and outscored opponents by a total of 89 to 42.

In July 1925, DePaul hired Eddie Anderson as its head football, basketball, and track coach. He had played at the end position for Knute Rockne at Notre Dame and served as head football coach at Columbia (IA) from 1922 to 1924. Rockne called him "one of the smartest players I have ever coached."

== Schedule ==
Date	Opponent	Site	Result	Source
October 3	Elmhurst*		W 43–0	
	6th Army Corps*		W 7–0	
October 24	Columbia (IA)	Chicago, IL	W 12–0	
October 31	at St. Norbert*	De Pere, WI	L 7–10	
November 7	at Valparaiso	Valparaiso, IN	W 7–6	
November 21	at La Crosse Normal	La Crosse, WI	T 13–13	
November 26	St. Viator^{†}	DePaul Field; Chicago, IL	L 0–13	
*Non-conference game; ^{†}Homecoming
