= 1927 Tulsa Golden Hurricane football team =

American college football season

1927 Tulsa Golden Hurricane football
- Conference: Oklahoma Intercollegiate Conference
- Record: 8–1 (3–1 OIC)
- Head coach: Gus Henderson (3rd season)
- Home stadium: McNulty Park

1927 Oklahoma Intercollegiate Conference football standings
	Conf.					Overall
Team	W		L		T	W		L		T
Oklahoma City +	5	–	1	–	2	8	–	1	–	2
Oklahoma Baptist +	5	–	1	–	1	6	–	1	–	2
Tulsa	3	–	1	–	0	8	–	1	–	0
Central State Teachers	3	–	1	–	3	3	–	1	–	4
Phillips	5	–	2	–	1	5	–	2	–	1
Northeastern State	2	–	3	–	1	3	–	4	–	1
Northwestern Oklahoma State	1	–	3	–	1	4	–	3	–	1
Southeastern Oklahoma State	1	–	4	–	1	2	–	5	–	3
Southwestern State	1	–	5	–	1	1	–	6	–	2
East Central	0	–	6	–	1	1	–	6	–	1
+ – Conference co-champions

The 1927 Tulsa Golden Hurricane football team represented the University of Tulsa during the 1927 college football season. In their third year under head coach Gus Henderson, the Golden Hurricane compiled an 8–1 record and outscored their opponents by a total of 206 to 84.

== Schedule ==
Date	Opponent	Site	Result	Attendance	Source
October 1	Parsons*	McNulty Park; Tulsa, OK	W 19–6		
October 8	South Dakota*	McNulty Park; Tulsa, OK	W 33–12	3,000	
October 15	at DePaul*	Wrigley Field; Chicago, IL	W 30–6		
October 22	at Oklahoma A&M*	Lewis Field; Stillwater, OK (rivalry)	W 28–26		
October 29	Phillips	McNulty Park; Tulsa, OK	L 7–13		
November 5	Oklahoma City	McNulty Park; Tulsa, OK	W 7–0		
November 11	Oklahoma Baptist	McNulty Park; Tulsa, OK	W 21–7		
November 19	Southeastern Oklahoma State^{†}	McNulty Park; Tulsa, OK	W 32–0		
December 3	Haskell*	McNulty Park; Tulsa, OK	W 24–14		
*Non-conference game; ^{†}Homecoming
