= 1909–10 Kansas Jayhawks men's basketball team =

American college basketball season

1909–10 Kansas Jayhawks men's basketball

MVIAA Champions
- Conference: MVIAA
- Record: 18–1 (7–1 MVIAA)
- Head coach: W. O. Hamilton (1st season)
- Captain: Thomas Johnson
- Home arena: Robinson Gymnasium

1909–10 Missouri Valley Intercollegiate Athletic Association men's basketball standings
	Conf.				Overall
Team	W		L	PCT	W		L	PCT
North Division
Nebraska	6	–	2	.750	6	–	10	.375
Iowa State	6	–	2	.750	9	–	7	.563
Drake	0	–	8	.000	0	–	12	.000
South Division
Kansas†	7	–	1	.875	18	–	1	.947
Washington University	4	–	4	.500	7	–	5	.583
Missouri	1	–	7	.125	7	–	11	.389
† Conference championship winner

The 1909–10 Kansas Jayhawks men's basketball team represented the University of Kansas in its twelfth season of collegiate basketball, and its third in the Missouri Valley Intercollegiate Athletic Association, or MVIAA. The team would go on to win its third MVIAA Conference Championship. The head coach was W. O. Hamilton, serving in his first year in that capacity for Kansas. On January 15, the Jayhawks reached their first major milestone victory in reaching its 100th win. The Jayhawks finished the season 18–1.

== Roster ==
- Robert Heizer
- Tommy Johnson
- Harold Larson
- Verne Long
- Donald Martindell
- Verni Smith
- Edward Van der Vries
- Raymond Watson
- Earl Woodward

== Schedule ==
Date time, TV	Opponent	Result	Record	Site city, state
Jan. 7, 1910*	Nebraska	W 33-17	1–0	Robinson Gymnasium; Lawrence, Kansas
Jan. 8, 1910*	Nebraska	W 40-16	2–0	Robinson Gymnasium; Lawrence, Kansas
Jan. 15, 1910	Washington (Mo.)	W 46–7	3–0	Robinson Gymnasium; Lawrence, Kansas
Jan. 17, 1910	Washington (Mo.)	W 34–13	4–0	Robinson Gymnasium; Lawrence, Kansas
Jan. 21, 1910*	Baker	W 37–24	5–0	Robinson Gymnasium; Lawrence, Kansas
Jan. 22, 1910*	at Baker	W 27–21	6–0	Baldwin City, Kansas
Jan. 27, 1910*	Kansas State; Sunflower Showdown	W 44–19	7–0	Robinson Gymnasium; Lawrence, Kansas
Jan. 28, 1910*	Bethany	W 47–22	8–0	Robinson Gymnasium; Lawrence, Kansas
Feb. 11, 1910	Missouri	W 29–15	9–0	Robinson Gymnasium; Lawrence, Kansas
Feb. 12, 1910	Missouri; Border War	W 27–14	10–0	Robinson Gymnasium; Lawrence, Kansas
Feb. 18, 1910	at Kansas City AC	W 34–31	11–0	Club House; Kansas City, Missouri
Feb. 19, 1910	at Washington (Mo.)	W 19–16	12–0	Francis Gymnasium; St. Louis, Missouri
Feb. 20, 1910	at Washington (Mo.)	L 15–16	12–1	Francis Gymnasium; St. Louis, Missouri
Feb. 22, 1910	at Missouri	W 25–21	13–1	Border War; Columbia, Missouri
Feb. 23, 1910	at Missouri	W 58–22	14–1	Border War; Columbia, Missouri
Feb. 24, 1910	at Drake	W 62–33	15–1	Alumni Gymnasium; Des Moines, Iowa
Feb. 25, 1910	at Iowa State	W 34–18	16–1	Ames, Iowa
Feb. 26, 1910*	at Nebraska	W 40-20	17–1	Grant Memorial Hall; Lincoln, Nebraska
Feb. 27, 1910*	at Nebraska	W 40-13	18–1	Grant Memorial Hall; Lincoln, Nebraska
*Non-conference game. ^{#}Rankings from AP Poll. (#) Tournament seedings in parentheses. All times are in Central Standard Time.
