= 1927 Oklahoma City Goldbugs football team =

American college football season

1927 Oklahoma City Goldbugs football

OIC co-champion
- Conference: Oklahoma Intercollegiate Conference
- Record: 8–1–2 (5–1–2 OIC)
- Head coach: Pappy Waldorf (3rd season)
- Captain: Bill Moore

1927 Oklahoma Intercollegiate Conference football standings
	Conf.					Overall
Team	W		L		T	W		L		T
Oklahoma City +	5	–	1	–	2	8	–	1	–	2
Oklahoma Baptist +	5	–	1	–	1	6	–	1	–	2
Tulsa	3	–	1	–	0	8	–	1	–	0
Central State Teachers	3	–	1	–	3	3	–	1	–	4
Phillips	5	–	2	–	1	5	–	2	–	1
Northeastern State	2	–	3	–	1	3	–	4	–	1
Northwestern Oklahoma State	1	–	3	–	1	4	–	3	–	1
Southeastern Oklahoma State	1	–	4	–	1	2	–	5	–	3
Southwestern State	1	–	5	–	1	1	–	6	–	2
East Central	0	–	6	–	1	1	–	6	–	1
+ – Conference co-champions

The 1927 Oklahoma City Goldbugs football team was an American football team that represented Oklahoma City University during the 1927 college football season as a member of the Oklahoma Intercollegiate Conference (OIC). In Pappy Waldorf's, third and final season as head coach, the team compiled an 8–1–2 record (5–1–2 against conference opponents), shared the OIC title with Oklahoma Baptist, and outscored all opponents by a total of 162 to 43. The Goldbugs had an opportunity to secure the conference title in the final game of the season, but played a scoreless tie against Oklahoma Baptist on December 3.

Fullback Bill Moore was the team captain. Moore and center Ray Allen both received first-team honors on the Daily Oklahoman's All-Oklahoma first team. Quarterback Perk Whitman and end Jack Alexander were named to the second team. Freshman halfback Ace Gutowsky went on to play eight seasons in the National Football League and set the league's career rushing record.

Grady Skillern was an assistant coach in charge of the backfield. Waldorf, who also served as Oklahoma City's athletic director and track coach, left the school after the 1927 season to accept an assistant coaching position at the University of Kansas. He went on to coach at several other schools and was inducted into the College Football Hall of Fame in 1966.

== Schedule ==
Date	Time	Opponent	Site	Result	Attendance	Source
September 24	3:00 p.m.	Cameron*	University Field; Oklahoma City, OK	W 19–0		
September 30		Central State Teachers	State Fairgrounds; Oklahoma City, OK	T 7–7		
October 7		at Austin*	Sherman, TX	W 13–6		
October 14		at Phillips	Enid, OK	W 9–7		
October 22		Haskell^{†}*	Western League Park; Oklahoma City, OK	W 7–0	> 3,000	
October 29		Northeastern State	Oklahoma City, OK	W 15–3		
November 5		at Tulsa	McNulty Park; Tulsa, OK	L 0–7	3,500	
November 11		at Southeastern Oklahoma State	Durant, OK	W 18–7		
November 17		Southwestern State	Oklahoma City, OK	W 32–0		
November 24		at Northwestern Oklahoma State	Alva, OK	W 42–6		
December 3		Oklahoma Baptist	Western League Park; Oklahoma City, OK	T 0–0		
*Non-conference game; ^{†}Homecoming

== Roster ==
- Jack Alexander, end
- Roy Allen, center, 145 pounds
- Bill Doenges, guard/quarterback and president of the junior class, 165 pounds
- Os Doenges, tackle and president of the senior class, 170 pounds
- Eaton, end, 167 pounds
- Ace Gutowsky, halfback, 169 pounds
- Hal Hilpirt, guard, 167 pounds
- Bill Moore, fullback and captain, 170 pounds
- Perry, end, 168 pounds
- Sadler, tackle/guard, 180 pounds
- Watson, tackle, 189 pounds
- Chuck Wheatley, halfback, 156 pounds
- "Perk" Whitman, quarterback, 136 pounds

The team's players had an average weight of 165 pounds. Senior Catherine Schumaker, president of the school's pep council, was voted by the members of the team as the "Football Queen" for 1927.

=== Gallery of players ===
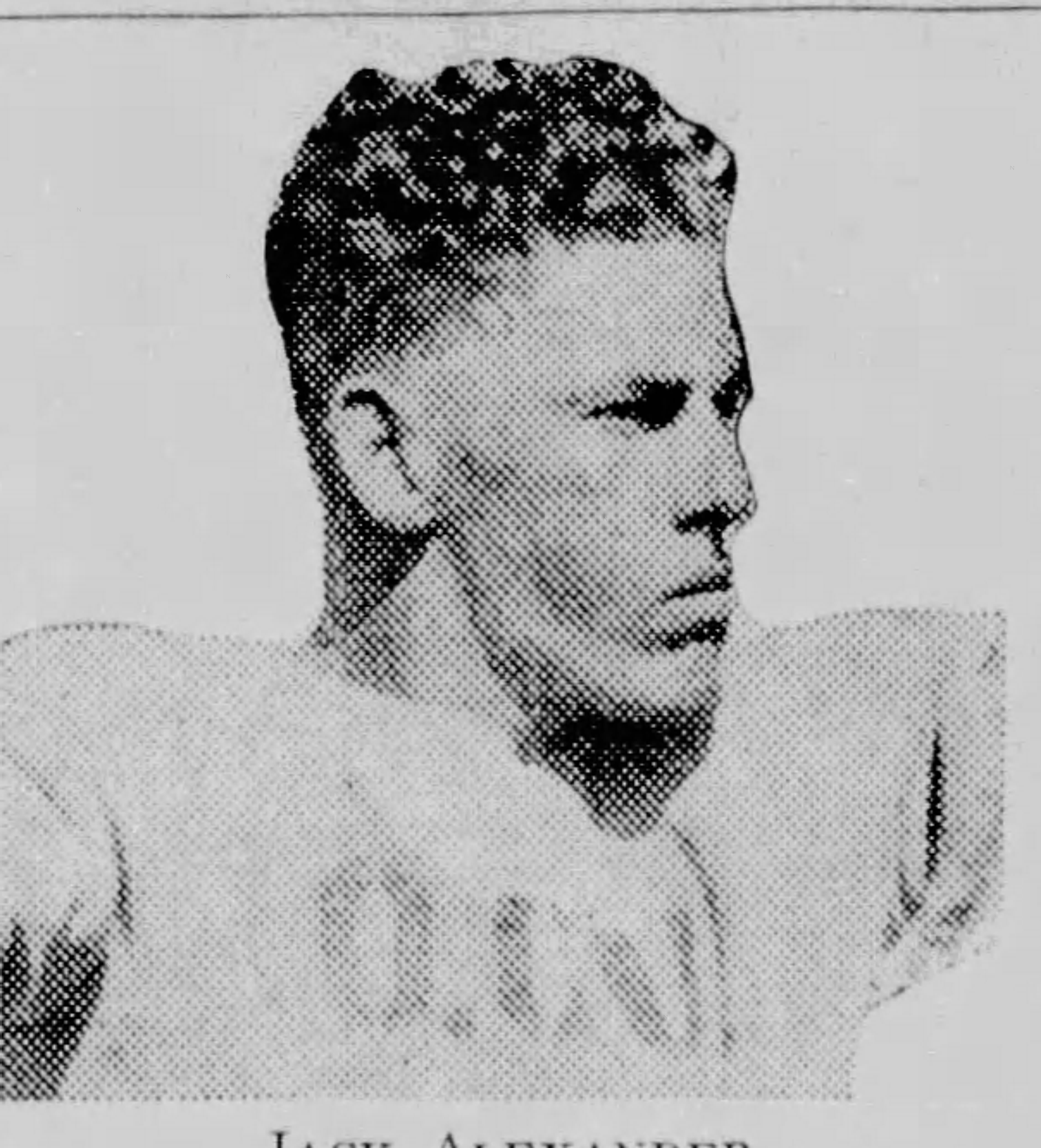
Jack Alexander

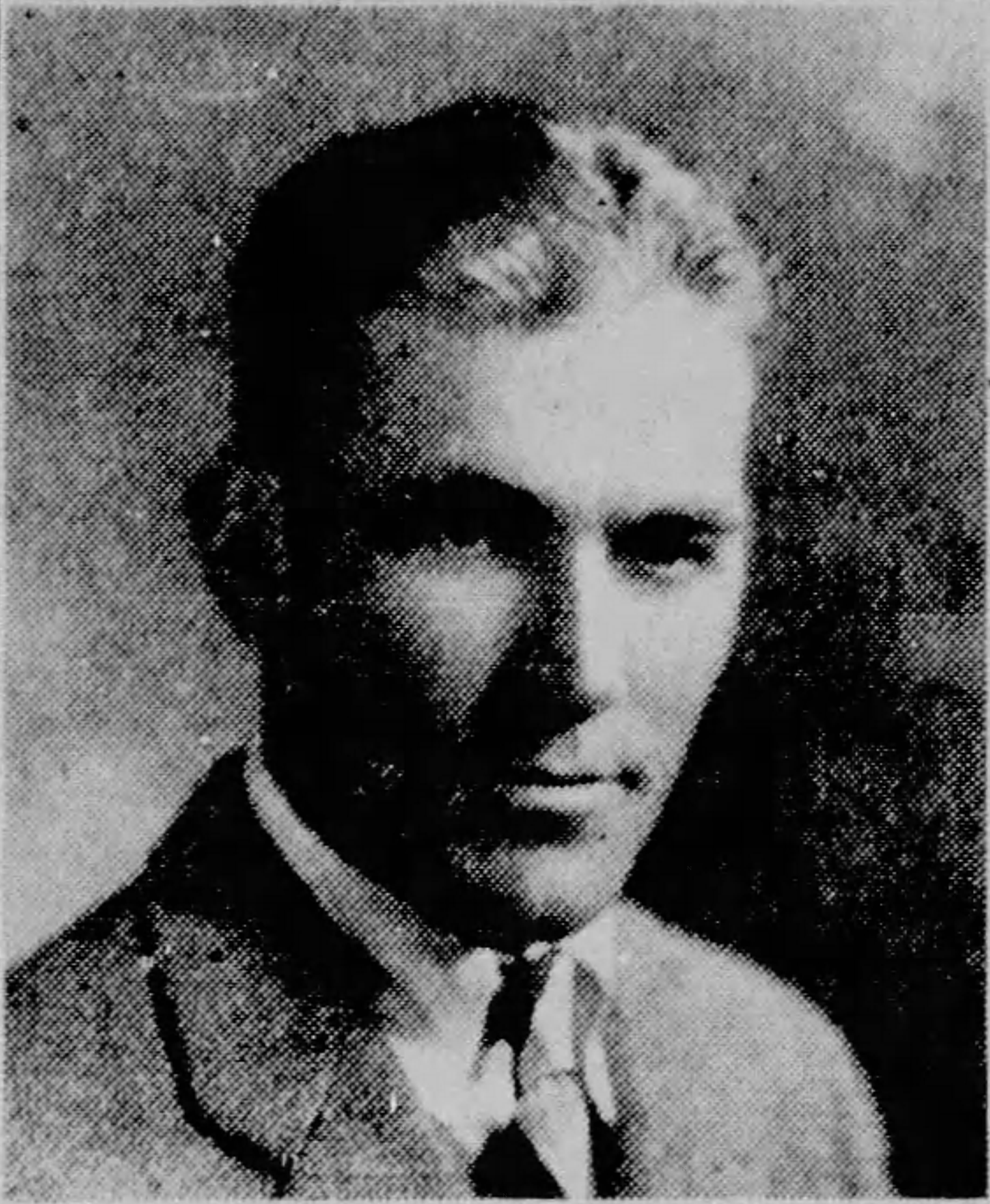
Roy Allen

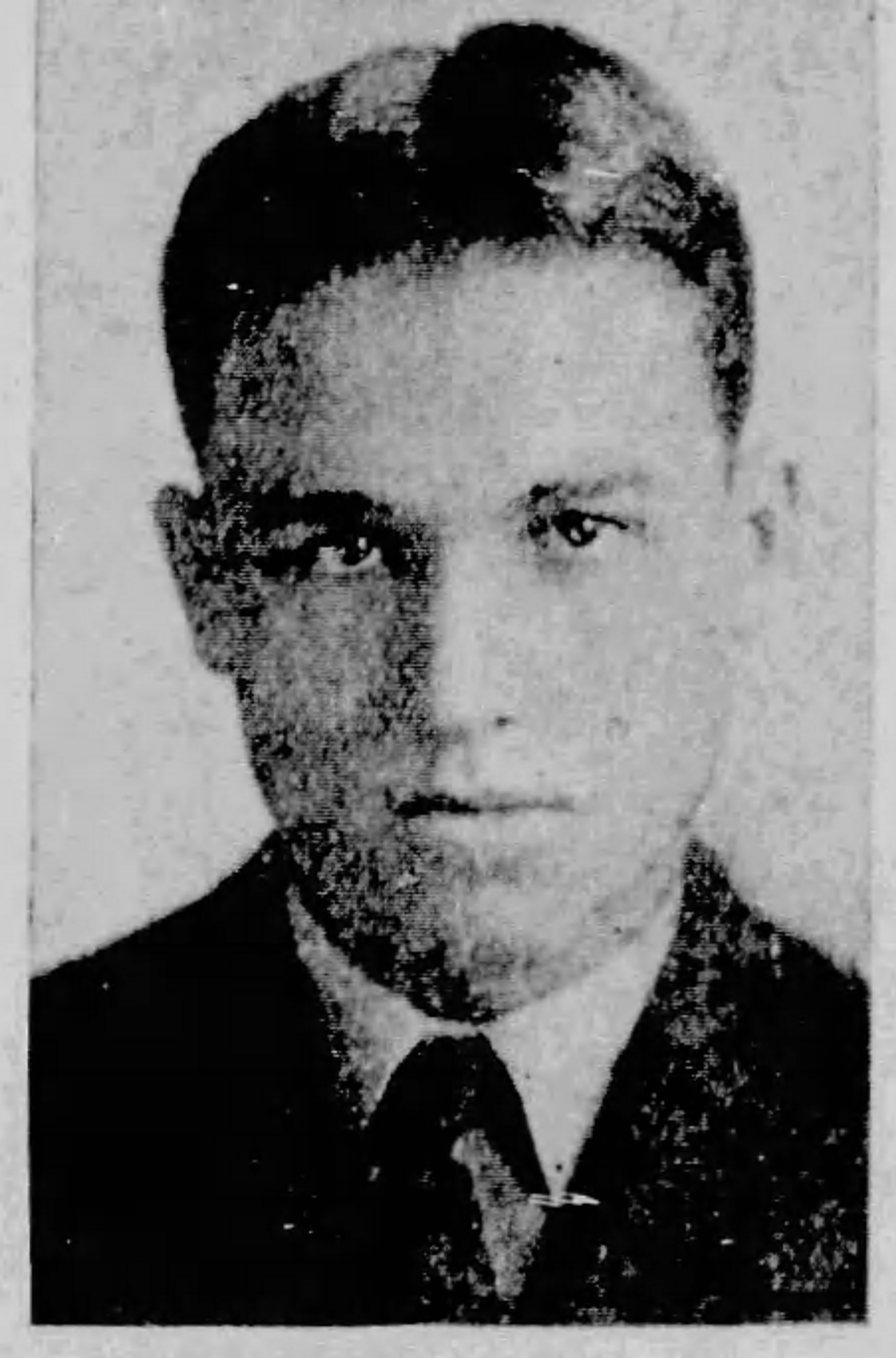
Bill Doenges

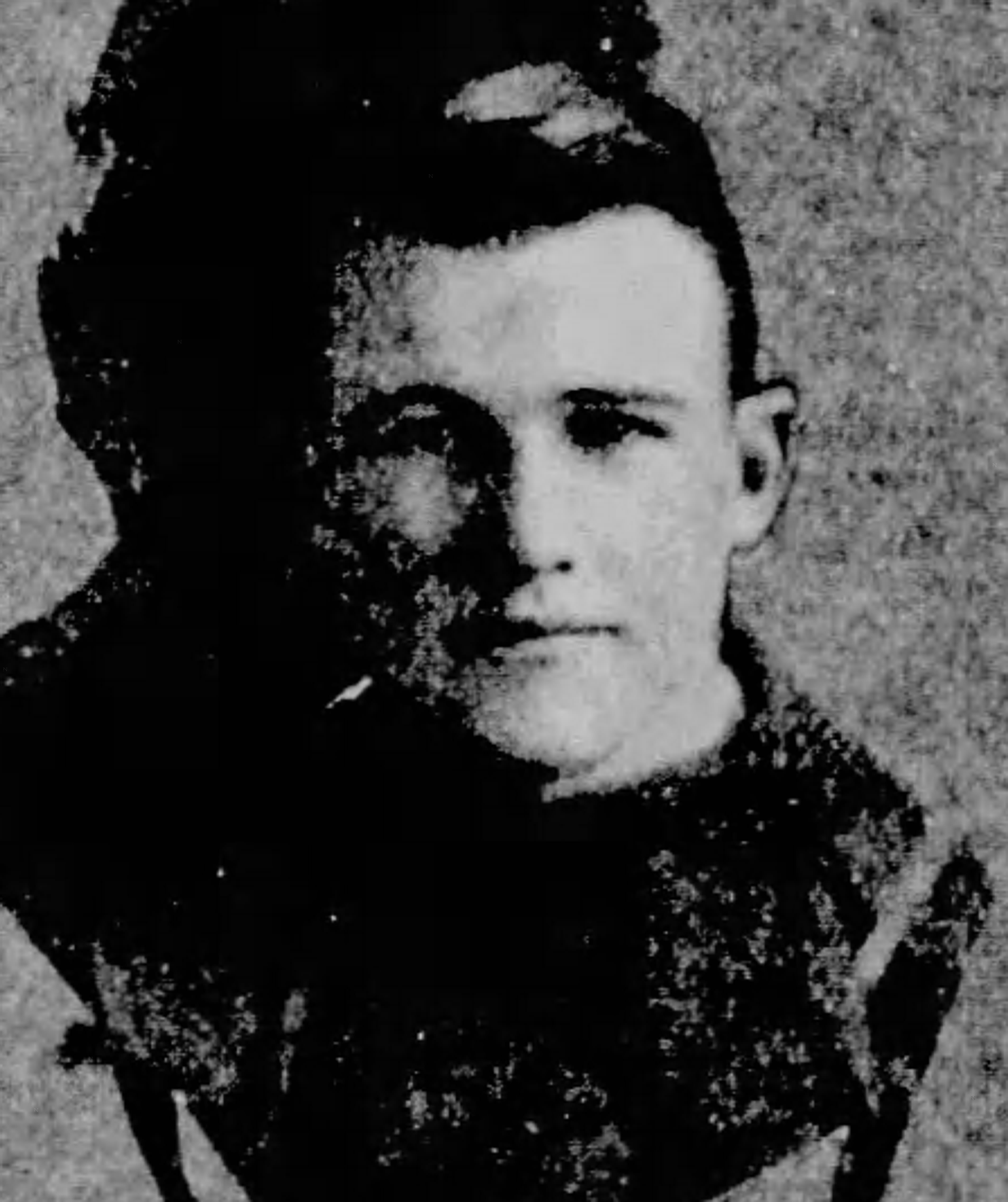
Hal Hilpirt

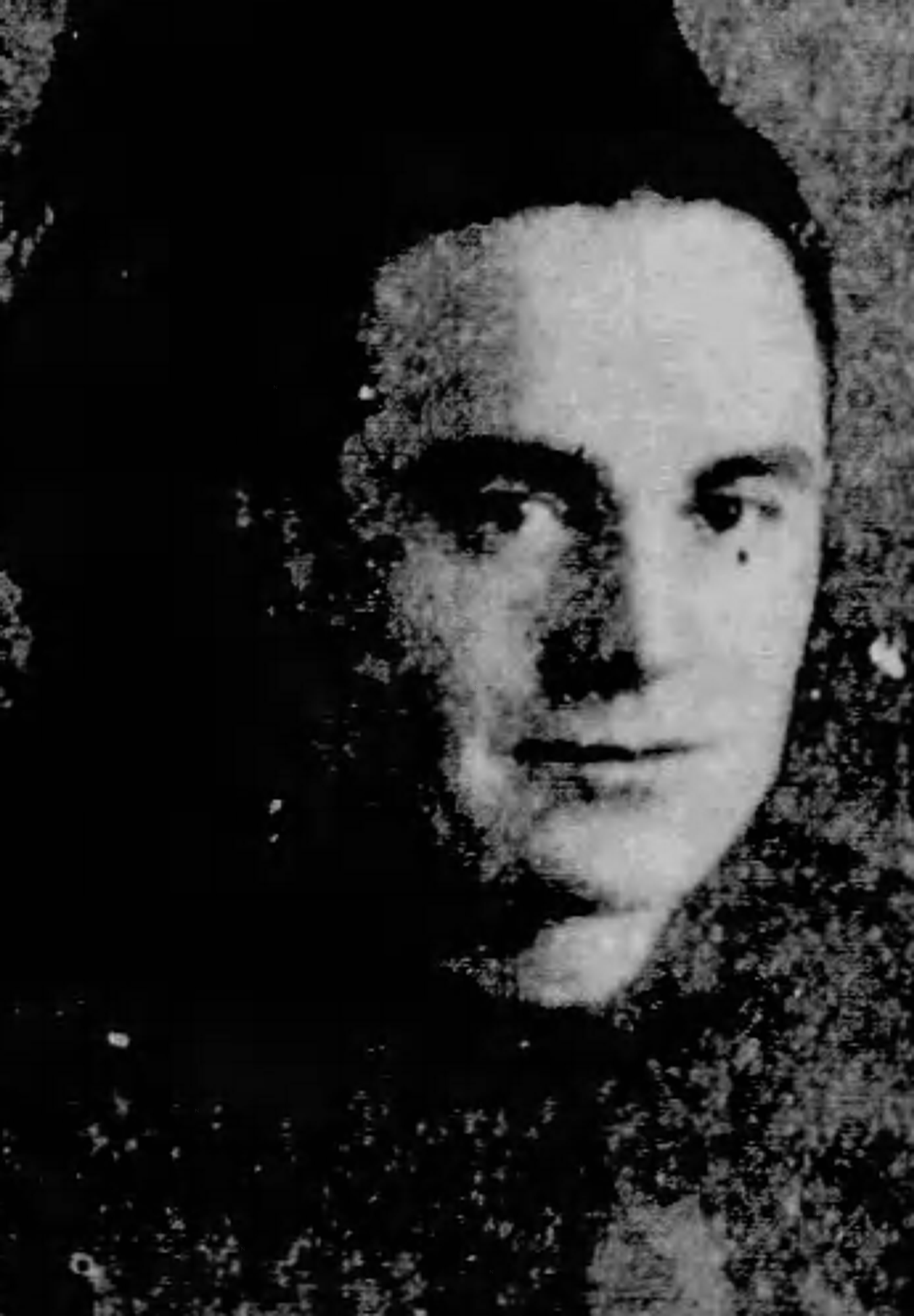
Chuck Wheatley

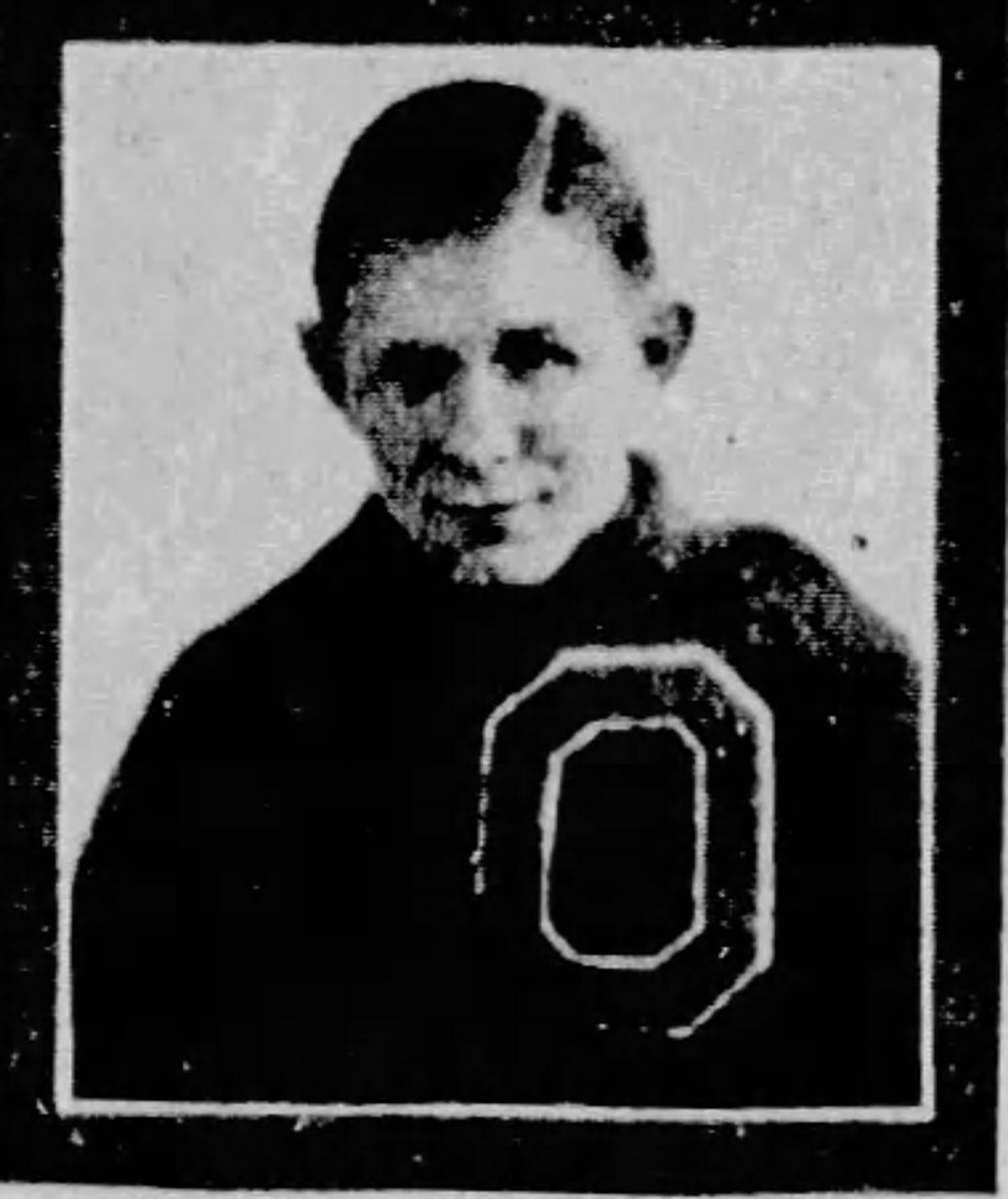
Perk Whitman
