= 1909–10 Iowa State Cyclones men's basketball team =

American college basketball season

1909–10 Iowa State Cyclones men's basketball
- Conference: Missouri Valley Intercollegiate Athletic Association
- Record: 9–7 (6–2 MVIAA)
- Head coach: Clyde Williams (3rd season)
- Home arena: Margaret Hall Gymnasium

1909–10 Missouri Valley Intercollegiate Athletic Association men's basketball standings
	Conf.				Overall
Team	W		L	PCT	W		L	PCT
North Division
Nebraska	6	–	2	.750	6	–	10	.375
Iowa State	6	–	2	.750	9	–	7	.563
Drake	0	–	8	.000	0	–	12	.000
South Division
Kansas†	7	–	1	.875	18	–	1	.947
Washington University	4	–	4	.500	7	–	5	.583
Missouri	1	–	7	.125	7	–	11	.389
† Conference championship winner

The 1909–10 Iowa State Cyclones men's basketball team (also known informally as Ames) represented Iowa State University during the 1909–10 IAAUS men's basketball season. The Cyclones were coached by Clyde Williams, in his third season with the Cyclones. The Cyclones played their home games at the Margaret Hall Gymnasium in Ames, Iowa.

They finished the season 9–7, 6–2 in Missouri Valley play to finish in second place in the North division.

== Roster ==
1909–10 Iowa State Cyclones men's basketball team
Players
Coaches

Pos.	#	Name	Height	Weight	Year	Hometown
F		Joe Brown	—	—	Jr	Sioux City, Iowa
G		Allie Chappel	—	—		West Des Moines, Iowa
F		Howard Herbert (C)	—	—
		Clark Mosher	—	—	Jr
C		Edward Te Veltrup	6 ft 3 in (1.91 m)	—		Sioux City, Iowa
G		Robert Walker	—	—		Des Moines, Iowa
F		Albert Weiss	—	—	Jr	Denison, Iowa

Head coach

- Clyde Williams

Assistant coach(es)

Legend

- (C) Team captain
- (S) Suspended
- (I) Ineligible
- (W) Walk-on
- Injured
- Current redshirt

== Schedule and results ==
Date time, TV	Rank^{#}	Opponent^{#}	Result	Record	Site city, state
Regular season
January 20, 1910*		at Nebraska Wesleyan	W 40–37	1–0	Lincoln, Nebraska
January 21, 1910		at Nebraska	L 21–24	1–1 (0–1)	Grant Memorial Hall; Lincoln, Nebraska
January 22, 1910		at Nebraska	L 26–29	1–2 (0–2)	Grant Memorial Hall; Lincoln, Nebraska
January 25, 1910		Drake; Iowa Big Four	W 40–16	2–2 (1–2)	Margaret Hall Gymnasium; Ames, Iowa
February 1, 1910; 8:30 pm		at Drake; Iowa Big Four	W 32–13	3–2 (2–2)	Alumni Gymnasium; Des Moines, Iowa
February 2, 1910*		Nebraska Wesleyan	W 36–16	4–2	Margaret Hall Gymnasium; Ames, Iowa
February 5, 1910*		Iowa; CyHawk Rivalry	L 27–30	4–3	Margaret Hall Gymnasium; Ames, Iowa
February 11, 1910		Nebraska	W 34–23	5–3 (3–2)	Margaret Hall Gymnasium; Ames, Iowa
February 12, 1910		Nebraska	W 18–17	6–3 (4–2)	Margaret Hall Gymnasium; Ames, Iowa
February 15, 1910*		Missouri	W 13–11	7–3	Margaret Hall Gymnasium; Ames, Iowa
February 16, 1910		Drake; Iowa Big Four	W 33–23	8–3 (5–2)	Margaret Hall Gymnasium; Ames, Iowa
February 18, 1910		at Drake; Iowa Big Four	W 12–11	9–3 (6–2)	Alumni Gymnasium; Des Moines, Iowa
February 19, 1910*		Grinnell	L 15–56	9–4	Margaret Hall Gymnasium; Ames, Iowa
February 24, 1910*		Kansas	L 18–34	9–5	Margaret Hall Gymnasium; Ames, Iowa
February 25, 1910*		at Grinnell	L 7–25	9–6	Grinnell, Iowa
February 26, 1910*		at Iowa; CyHawk Rivalry	L 12–24	9–7	First Iowa Armory; Iowa City, Iowa
*Non-conference game. ^{#}Rankings from AP poll. (#) Tournament seedings in parentheses. All times are in Central Time.
