= 1926 DePaul Blue Demons football team =

American college football season

1926 DePaul Blue Demons football
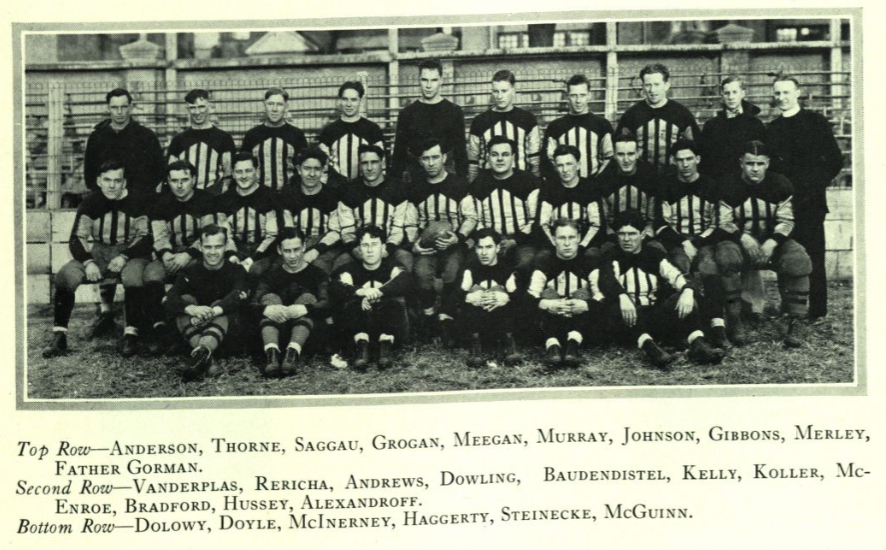

WIC champion
- Conference: Western Interstate Conference
- Record: 3–3 (2–1 WIC)
- Head coach: Eddie Anderson (2nd season)
- Home stadium: DePaul Field

The 1926 DePaul Blue Demons football team was an American football team that represented DePaul University as an independent during the 1926 college football season. In its second season under head coach Eddie Anderson, the team compiled a 3–3 record and outscored opponents by a total of 83 to 63.

== Schedule ==
Date	Opponent	Site	Result	Source
October 9	Saint Mary's (MN)*	DePaul Field; Chicago, IL	L 7–13	
October 16	at Columbia (IA)	Dubuque, IA	L 7–8	
October 23	Niagara^{†}*	Chicago, IL	L 6–28	
October 30	La Crosse Normal*	Chicago, IL	W 37–14	
November 13	Valparaiso	Chicago, IL	W 19–0	
November 25	St. Viator	DePaul Field; Chicago, IL	W 7–0	
*Non-conference game; ^{†}Homecoming
