= 1909–10 Chicago Maroons men's basketball team =

American college basketball season

1909–10 Chicago Maroons men's basketball

Western Conference Champions
- Conference: Big Ten Conference
- Record: 10–3 (9–3 Western)
- Head coach: Joseph Raycroft (4th season)
- Assistant coach: John Schommer
- Captain: Arthur Hoffman
- Home arena: Bartlett Gymnasium

1909–10 Western Conference men's basketball standings
	Conf.				Overall
Team	W		L	PCT	W		L	PCT
Chicago	9	–	3	.750	10	–	3	.769
Minnesota	7	–	3	.700	10	–	3	.769
Wisconsin	7	–	5	.583	9	–	5	.643
Illinois	5	–	4	.556	5	–	4	.556
Purdue	5	–	5	.500	8	–	5	.615
Iowa	2	–	2	.500	11	–	3	.786
Indiana	3	–	7	.300	5	–	8	.385
Northwestern	0	–	9	.000	0	–	9	.000

The 1909–10 Chicago Maroons men's basketball team represented the University of Chicago in intercollegiate basketball during the 1909–10 season. The team finished the season with a 10–3 record This was the fourth consecutive season for which Chicago was the Western Conference champion. The team played their home games on campus at Frank Dickinson Bartlett Gymnasium.

At seasons end, Pat Page was named an All-American, while also being named the Helms Foundation National Player of the Year. For Page, it was his fourth consecutive All-American honor; for the university, it was the second Helms National Player of the Year award earned by a player.

== Roster ==
Player	Position	Class	Hometown
Arthur Hoffman captain	Guard	Senior	Chicago, IL
Harlan "Pat" Page	Guard	Senior	Chicago, IL
Edwin Hubble	Center	Senior	Marshfield, MO
John S. Edwards	Center	Sophomore	Sunbury, OH
Clark George Sauer	Forward	Sophomore	Dana, IL
Joy Reichelt Clark	Forward	Senior	Omaha, NE
Alfred Crenshaw Kelly, Jr.	Forward	Senior	Chicago, IL
Fay George Fulkerson	Substitute	Junior	Holden, MO
John Bellew Boyle	Substitute	Sophomore	Morris, IL
Charles Everett Brown	Substitute	Sophomore	Chicago, IL
Meyer Goldstein	Substitute	Junior	Chicago, IL

- Head coach: Joseph Raycroft (4th year at Chicago)

== Schedule ==
Date time, TV	Opponent	Result	Record	Site city, state
1/15/1910 no, no	vs. Northwestern	W 31-4	1-0 (1-0)	Bartlett Gymnasium; Chicago, IL
1/21/1910 no, no	vs. Indiana	W 50–12	2-0 (2-0)	Bartlett Gymnasium; Chicago, IL
1/25/1910 no, no	@ Northwestern	W 45–6	3-0 (3-0)	Patten Gymnasium; Evanston, IL
1/28/1910 no, no	vs. Wisconsin	W 16–14	4-0 (4-0)	Bartlett Gymnasium; Chicago, IL
2/5/1910 no, no	vs. Purdue	W 30–19	5-0 (5-0)	Bartlett Gymnasium; Chicago, IL
2/8/1910 no, no	@ Illinois	W 21–11	6-0 (5-0)	Kenney Gym; Urbana, IL
2/12/1910 no, no	@ Minnesota	L 10–15	6-1 (6-1)	University of Minnesota Armory; Minneapolis, MN
2/18/1910 no, no	@ Purdue	W 26–17	7-1 (7-1)	Lafayette Colliseum; West Lafayette, IN
2/19/1910 no, no	@ Indiana	W 31–8	8-1 (8-1)	Old Assembly Hall; Bloomington, IN
2/26/1910 no, no	vs. Illinois	L 15–24	8-2 (8-2)	Bartlett Gymnasium; Chicago, IL
3/5/1910 no, no	@ Wisconsin	L 10–11	8-3 (8-3)	University of Wisconsin Armory and Gymnasium; Madison, WI
3/12/1910 no, no	vs. Minnesota	W 18–15	9-3 (9-3)	Bartlett Gymnasium; Chicago, IL
*Non-conference game. ^{#}Rankings from AP Poll. (#) Tournament seedings in parentheses. All times are in Central Time.
