= 1909–10 Missouri Tigers men's basketball team =

American college basketball season

1909–10 Missouri Tigers men's basketball
- Conference: MVIAA
- Record: 8–11 (3–7 MVIAA)
- Head coach: Guy Lowman
- Home arena: Rothwell Gymnasium

1909–10 Missouri Valley Intercollegiate Athletic Association men's basketball standings
	Conf.				Overall
Team	W		L	PCT	W		L	PCT
North Division
Nebraska	6	–	2	.750	6	–	10	.375
Iowa State	6	–	2	.750	9	–	7	.563
Drake	0	–	8	.000	0	–	12	.000
South Division
Kansas†	7	–	1	.875	18	–	1	.947
Washington University	4	–	4	.500	7	–	5	.583
Missouri	1	–	7	.125	7	–	11	.389
† Conference championship winner

The 1909–10 Missouri Tigers men's basketball team represented University of Missouri in the 1909–10 college basketball season. The team was led by second year head coach Guy Lowman. The captain of the team was Frank Burress.

Missouri finished with an 8–11 record overall and a 3–7 record in the Missouri Valley Conference. This was good enough for a 3rd-place finish in the regular season conference standings.

== Schedule and results ==
Date time, TV	Rank^{#}	Opponent^{#}	Result	Record	Site city, state
January 10*		William Jewell	W 42–19	1–0	Columbia, Missouri
January 11*		William Jewell	W 37–35	2–0	Columbia, Missouri
January 13		Washington (MO)	W 25–10	3–0 (1–0)	Columbia, Missouri
January 14		Washington (MO)	W 30–9	4–0 (2–0)	Columbia, Missouri
January 21*		Grinnell	L 30–34	4–1 (2–0)	Columbia, Missouri
January 22*		Grinnell	L 8–32	4–2 (2–0)	Columbia, Missouri
February 5*		Emporia State	W 32–8	5–2 (2–0)	Columbia, Missouri
February 9*		at Central Missouri	W 28–27	6–2 (2–0)	Warrensburg, Missouri
February 10*		at Central Missouri	W 20–19	7–2 (2–0)	Warrensburg, Missouri
February 11		at Kansas	L 15–29	7–3 (2–1)	Lawrence, Kansas
February 12		at Kansas	L 14–27	7–4 (2–2)	Lawrence, Kansas
February 14		at Drake	W 28–7	8–4 (3–2)	Des Moines, Iowa
February 15		at Iowa State	L 11–13	8–5 (3–3)	Ames, Iowa
February 16*		at Iowa	L 6–20	8–6 (3–3)	Iowa City, Iowa
February 21		Kansas	L 21–25	8–7 (3–4)	Columbia, Missouri
February 22		Kansas	L 22–58	8–8 (3–5)	Columbia, Missouri
February 28		at Washington (MO)	L 12–24	8–9 (3–6)	St. Louis, Missouri
March 1		at Washington (MO)	L 13–35	8–10 (3–7)	St. Louis, Missouri
March 23*		MO Athletic Club	L 22–32	8–11 (3–7)	Columbia, Missouri
*Non-conference game. ^{#}Rankings from Coaches' Poll. (#) Tournament seedings in parentheses. All times are in Central Standard Time.
