= 1909–10 Illinois Fighting Illini men's basketball team =

American college basketball season

1909–10 Illinois Fighting Illini men's basketball
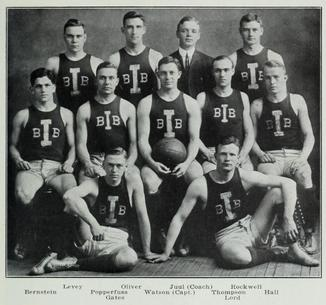
- Conference: Big Ten Conference
- Record: 5–4 (5–4 Big Ten)
- Head coach: Herb V. Juul (2nd season)
- Captain: Carl Watson
- Home arena: Kenney Gym

1909–10 Western Conference men's basketball standings
| | Conf. | | | | Overall |
| Team | W | | L | PCT | W | | L | PCT |
|---|---|---|---|---|---|---|---|---|
| Chicago | 9 | – | 3 | .750 | 10 | – | 3 | .769 |
| Minnesota | 7 | – | 3 | .700 | 10 | – | 3 | .769 |
| Wisconsin | 7 | – | 5 | .583 | 9 | – | 5 | .643 |
| Illinois | 5 | – | 4 | .556 | 5 | – | 4 | .556 |
| Purdue | 5 | – | 5 | .500 | 8 | – | 5 | .615 |
| Iowa | 2 | – | 2 | .500 | 11 | – | 3 | .786 |
| Indiana | 3 | – | 7 | .300 | 5 | – | 8 | .385 |
| Northwestern | 0 | – | 9 | .000 | 0 | – | 9 | .000 |

The 1909–10 Illinois Fighting Illini men's basketball team represented the University of Illinois.

== Regular season ==
For the first time since organized basketball became a sanctioned sport within the university, the Fighting Illini basketball team was led by a returning head coach. Herb V. Juul remained as the head coach of a team that played only nine games, each being a conference game. The Illini finished their season with a record of five wins, four losses and a fourth-place finish in the Western Conference. The starting lineup for the team included Albert L. Hall and Henry J. Popperfuss as forwards, captain Carl P. Watson at center, and Louis S. Bernstein and Thomas Thompson as guards.

=== Roster ===
1909–10 Illinois Fighting Illini men's basketball team
Players
Coaches

| Pos. | # | Name | Height | Weight | Year | Hometown |
|---|---|---|---|---|---|---|
| F | | Carl Watson (C) | — | — | Jr | DeKalb, Illinois |
| F | | Henry Popperfuss | — | — | Sr | Tomah, Wisconsin |
| C | | Emmett V. Poston | — | — | Jr | Springfield, Illinois |
| G | | Thomas E. Thompson | — | — | Sr | Williams Bay, Wisconsin |
| G | | Louis S. Bernstein | — | — | Jr | Niagara Falls, New York |
| F | | Albert L. Hall | — | — | So | Libertyville, Illinois |
| C | | Chouncey B. Oliver | — | — | So | Blue Diamond, Nevada |
| G | | James G. White | — | — | Fr | Chicago, Illinois |
| F | | Chester Arthur Lord | — | — | Sr | Sioux Falls, South Dakota |
| F | | Clarence John Levey | — | — | So | Chicago, Illinois |
| F | | Ralph Pillsbury Gates | — | — | So | Chicago, Illinois |
| G | | Van Rockwell | — | — | Jr | St. Charles, Illinois |

Head coach

- Herb V. Juul (University of Illinois) (2nd year)

Assistant coach(es)

Legend

- (C) Team captain
- (S) Suspended
- (I) Ineligible
- (W) Walk-on
- Injured
- Current redshirt

Roster

== Schedule ==
| Date time, TV | Rank^{#} | Opponent^{#} | Result | Record | Site city, state |
Big Ten regular season
| 1/15/1910 | | at Wisconsin | L 16–28 | 0-1 (0-1) | University of Wisconsin Armory and Gymnasium; Madison, WI |
| 1/21/1910 | | Wisconsin | W 34–14 | 1-1 (1-1) | Kenney Gym; Urbana, IL |
| 1/29/1910 | | Purdue | W 33–17 | 2-1 (2-1) | Kenney Gym; Urbana, IL |
| 2/5/1910 | | Indiana; Rivalry | W 30–20 | 3-1 (3-1) | Kenney Gym; Urbana, IL |
| 2/8/1910 | | University of Chicago | L 11–21 | 3-2 (3-2) | Kenney Gym; Urbana, IL |
| 2/26/1910 | | at University of Chicago | W 24–15 | 4-2 (4-2) | Bartlett Gymnasium; Chicago, IL |
| 3/4/1910 | | at Purdue | L 10–27 | 4-3 (4-3) | Memorial Gymnasium; West Lafayette, IN |
| 3/5/1910 | | at Indiana; Rivalry | W 27–12 | 5-3 (5-3) | Old Assembly Hall; Bloomington, IN |
| 3/9/1910 | | Minnesota | L 9–22 | 5-4 (5-4) | Kenney Gym; Urbana, IL |
*Non-conference game. ^{#}Rankings from AP Poll. (#) Tournament seedings in parentheses. All times are in Central Time.
