= Robert L. Stevenson (coach) =

American sports coach (1890–1952)

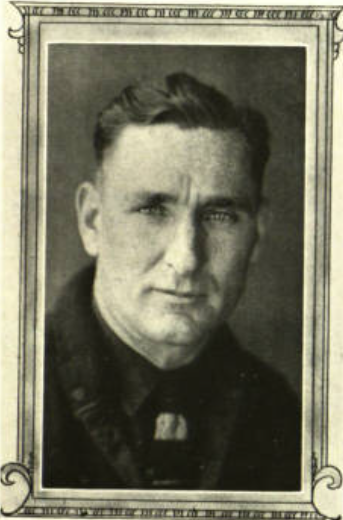
- Stevenson, c. 1924

Biographical details
- Born: September 17, 1890; Albert Lea, Minnesota, U.S.
- Died: March 11, 1952 (aged 61); Hines, Illinois, U.S.

Playing career

Football
- c. 1910: Carleton

Basketball
- c. 1910: Carleton

Baseball
- c. 1910: Carleton
- 1913: New Orleans Pelicans
- 1914: LaSalle Blue Sox

Track and field
- c. 1910: Carleton
- Positions: Outfielder, pitcher (baseball)

Coaching career (HC unless noted)

Football
- 1913–1914: Pillsbury Academy (MN)
- 1918–1921: East HS (MN)
- 1923: DePaul

Basketball
- 1912–1913: Gustavus Adolphus
- 1923–1924: DePaul

Baseball
- 1914–1915: Pillsbury Academy (MN)
- 1924–1926: DePaul

Administrative career (AD unless noted)
- 1913–1915: Pillsbury Academy (MN)

Head coaching record
- Overall: 3–4 (college football); 6–13 (college basketball); 16–9 (college baseball)

Robert Louis "Steve" Stevenson (September 17, 1890 – March 11, 1952) was an American football, basketball, and baseball coach. He coached those three sports at DePaul University during the mid-1920s.

Stevenson was a graduate of Carleton College and was a member of the football, baseball, basketball, and track teams. He was an assistant coach under Henry L. Williams at the University of Minnesota.

Stevenson coached the basketball team at Gustavus Adolphus College in St. Peter, Minnesota during the winter of 1912–13. The following fall, he coached the football team at Pillsbury Academy in Owatonna, Minnesota. He was also the athletic director at Pillsbury Academy for two years, until returning to his hometown of Albert Lea, Minnesota, in 1915, to go into the real estate business as manager of the Mabon Land Company. Stevenson succeeded Frank Haggerty as head coach at DePaul in 1923.

Stevenson died on March 11, 1952, at the Edward Hines Jr. Veterans Administration Hospital in Hines, Illinois, after suffering from cancer.

== Head coaching record ==
=== Football ===
Year	Team	Overall	Conference	Standing	Bowl/playoffs
DePaul Blue Demons (Independent) (1923–sing)
1923	DePaul	3–4			
DePaul:		3–4			
Total:		3–4			

=== College basketball ===
Record table
Season	Team	Overall	Conference	Standing	Postseason
Gustavus Adolphus Golden Gusties (Independent) (1912–1913)
1912–13	Gustavus Adolphus	12–1			
Gustavus Adolphus:		12–1			
DePaul Blue Demons (Independent) (1923–1924)
1923–24	DePaul	8–6			
DePaul:		8–6			
Total:		20–7			
