= 1909–10 Drake Bulldogs men's basketball team =

American college basketball season

1909–10 Drake Bulldogs men's basketball
- Conference: Missouri Valley Intercollegiate Athletic Association
- North
- Record: 0–12 (0–8 MVIAA)
- Head coach: John L. Griffith
- Home arena: None

1909–10 Missouri Valley Intercollegiate Athletic Association men's basketball standings
	Conf.				Overall
Team	W		L	PCT	W		L	PCT
North Division
Nebraska	6	–	2	.750	6	–	10	.375
Iowa State	6	–	2	.750	9	–	7	.563
Drake	0	–	8	.000	0	–	12	.000
South Division
Kansas†	7	–	1	.875	18	–	1	.947
Washington University	4	–	4	.500	7	–	5	.583
Missouri	1	–	7	.125	7	–	11	.389
† Conference championship winner

The 1909–10 Drake Bulldogs men's basketball team represented Drake University in the 1909–10 college basketball season. The team was led by first year head coach John L. Griffith. This was also Drake's third season as a member of the Missouri Valley Intercollegiate Athletic Association. They finished with a 3–8 (3–5 MVIAA) record the previous season. That had them finishing 3rd of 3 teams in the MVIAA North Division.

== Schedule ==
Missouri Valley Intercollegiate Athletic Association Standing: 3rd North Division
Date	Opponent*	Location	Time^{#}	Result	Overall	Conference
Regular Season Games
January 25, 1911	**Iowa State College**	Away		L 17–41	0–1	0–1
January 29, 1911	**Nebraska**	Away		L 6–27	0–2	0–2
February 1, 1911	**Iowa State College**	Home		L 14–30	0–3	0–3
February 4, 1911	Iowa	Away		L 8–26	0–4	0–3
February 9, 1911	**Nebraska**	Home		L 16–20	0–5	0–4
February 10, 1911	**Nebraska**	Home		L 13–22	0–6	0–5
February 16, 1911	**Iowa State College**	Away		L 23–33	0–7	0–6
February 18, 1911	Grinnell	Home		L 18–36	0–8	0–6
February 24, 1911	**Kansas**	Home		L 30–60	0–9	0–7
February 28, 1911	**Iowa State College**	Home		L 11–12	0–10	0–8
March 1, 1911	Iowa	Away		L 7–43	0–11	0–8
March 2, 1911	Grinnell	Away		L 8–52	0–12	0–8
All times are in CST. Conference games in **BOLD**.
