= 1909–10 Indiana Hoosiers men's basketball team =

American college basketball season

1909–10 Indiana Hoosiers men's basketball
- Conference: Big Ten Conference
- Record: 5–8 (3–7 Western)
- Head coach: John Georgen (1st season)
- Captain: Dean Barnhart
- Home arena: Old Assembly Hall

1909–10 Western Conference men's basketball standings
	Conf.				Overall
Team	W		L	PCT	W		L	PCT
Chicago	9	–	3	.750	10	–	3	.769
Minnesota	7	–	3	.700	10	–	3	.769
Wisconsin	7	–	5	.583	9	–	5	.643
Illinois	5	–	4	.556	5	–	4	.556
Purdue	5	–	5	.500	8	–	5	.615
Iowa	2	–	2	.500	11	–	3	.786
Indiana	3	–	7	.300	5	–	8	.385
Northwestern	0	–	9	.000	0	–	9	.000

The 1909–10 Indiana Hoosiers men's basketball team represented Indiana University. Their head coach was John Georgen, who was in his first and only year. The team played its home games at the Old Assembly Hall in Bloomington, Indiana, and was a member of the Western Conference.

The Hoosiers finished the regular season with an overall record of 5–8 and a conference record of 3–7, finishing 7th in the Western Conference.

== Roster ==
Name	Position	Year	Hometown
Jasper Abel	F	N/A	Tampico, Indiana
Dean Barnhart	F	Jr.	Rochester, Indiana
Merrill Davis	G	So.	Marion, Indiana
Phil Graves	C	So.	Orleans, Indiana
William Hipskind	F	Jr.	Wabash, Indiana
Emil Mangel	C	Sr.	Huntingburg, Indiana
Roscoe Stotter	G	N/A	Forest, Indiana
Claude Whitney	F	N/A	Muncie, Indiana

== Schedule/results ==
Date time, TV	Rank^{#}	Opponent^{#}	Result	Record	Site city, state
Regular season
1/10/1910*		at DePauw	W 23–17	1–0	Greencastle, IN
1/15/1910*		Rose Poly	W 37–21	2–0	Old Assembly Hall; Bloomington, IN
1/21/1910		at Chicago	L 12–50	2–1 (0–1)	Bartlett Gymnasium; Chicago, IL
1/22/1910		at Northwestern	W 29–20	3–1 (1–1)	Old Patten Gymnasium; Evanston, IL
1/29/1910		Wisconsin	W 13–11	4–1 (2–1)	Old Assembly Hall; Bloomington, IN
2/5/1910		at Illinois; Rivalry	L 20–30	4–2 (2–2)	Kenney Gym; Urbana, IL
2/8/1910		Purdue; Rivalry	L 18–23	4–3 (2–3)	Old Assembly Hall; Bloomington, IN
2/12/1910		Northwestern	W 18–10	5–3 (3–3)	Old Assembly Hall; Bloomington, IN
2/19/1910		Chicago	L 8–33	5–4 (3–4)	Old Assembly Hall; Bloomington, IN
2/26/1910*		at Rose Poly	L 21–23	5–5 (3–4)	Terre Haute, IN
3/1/1910		at Purdue; Rivalry	L 15–62	5–6 (3–5)	Memorial Gymnasium; West Lafayette, IN
3/5/1910		Illinois; Rivalry	L 12–26	5–7 (3–6)	Old Assembly Hall; Bloomington, IN
3/7/1910		at Wisconsin	L 8–33	5–8 (3–7)	Red Gym; Madison, WI
*Non-conference game. ^{#}Rankings from AP Poll. (#) Tournament seedings in parentheses.
