= 1909–10 Wisconsin Badgers men's basketball team =

American college basketball season

1909–10 Wisconsin Badgers men's basketball
- Conference: Big Ten Conference
- Record: 9–5 (7–5 Western)
- Head coach: Haskell Noyes
- Home arena: Red Gym

1909–10 Western Conference men's basketball standings
	Conf.				Overall
Team	W		L	PCT	W		L	PCT
Chicago	9	–	3	.750	10	–	3	.769
Minnesota	7	–	3	.700	10	–	3	.769
Wisconsin	7	–	5	.583	9	–	5	.643
Illinois	5	–	4	.556	5	–	4	.556
Purdue	5	–	5	.500	8	–	5	.615
Iowa	2	–	2	.500	11	–	3	.786
Indiana	3	–	7	.300	5	–	8	.385
Northwestern	0	–	9	.000	0	–	9	.000

The 1909–10 Wisconsin Badgers men's basketball team represented University of Wisconsin–Madison. The head coach was Haskell Noyes, coaching his second season with the Badgers. The team played their home games at the Red Gym in Madison, Wisconsin and was a member of the Western Conference.

== Schedule ==
Date time, TV	Rank^{#}	Opponent^{#}	Result	Record	Site city, state
Regular Season
12/15/1909*		Beloit (WI)	W 24–9	1–0	Red Gym; Madison, WI
12/17/1909*		Ripon (WI)	W 32–5	2–0	Red Gym; Madison, WI
1/08/1910		Northwestern	W 55–9	3–0 (1–0)	Red Gym; Madison, WI
1/21/1910		at Illinois	L 14–34	3–1 (1–1)	Kenney Gym; Urbana, IL
1/22/1910		at Purdue	L 17–29	3–2 (1–2)	Memorial Gymnasium; West Lafayette, IN
1/25/1910		Illinois	W 28–16	4–2 (2–2)	Red Gym; Madison, WI
1/28/1910		at Chicago	L 14–16	4–3 (2–3)	Bartlett Gymnasium; Chicago, IL
1/29/1910		at Indiana	L 11–13	4–4 (2–4)	Men's Gymnasium; Bloomington, IN
2/05/1910		Minnesota	W 24–14	5–4 (3–4)	Red Gym; Madison, WI
2/25/1910		at Minnesota	L 9–16	5–5 (3–5)	Minnesota Armory; Minneapolis, MN
2/26/1910		at Northwestern	W 39–11	6–5 (4–5)	Patten Gymnasium; Evanston, IL
3/05/1910		Chicago	W 11–10	7–5 (5–5)	Red Gym; Madison, WI
3/07/1910		Indiana	W 33–8	8–5 (6–5)	Red Gym; Madison, WI
3/12/1910		Purdue	W 38–14	9–5 (7–5)	Red Gym; Madison, WI
*Non-conference game. ^{#}Rankings from AP Poll. (#) Tournament seedings in parentheses.
