= Eddie Anderson (American football coach) =

American football player and coach, basketball coach

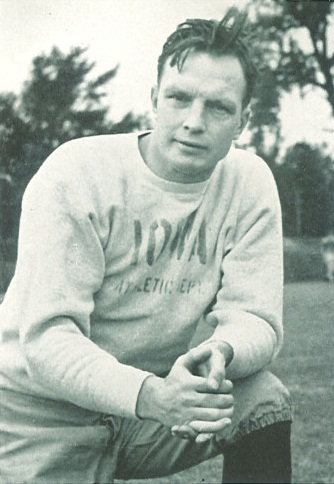
- Anderson as coach of the Iowa Hawkeyes in 1940

Biographical details
- Born: November 11, 1900; Oskaloosa, Iowa, U.S.
- Died: April 24, 1974 (aged 73); Clearwater, Florida, U.S.

Playing career

Football
- 1918–1921: Notre Dame
- 1922: Rochester Jeffersons
- 1922–1925: Chicago Cardinals
- Position: End

Coaching career (HC unless noted)

Football
- 1922–1924: Columbia (IA)
- 1925–1931: DePaul
- 1933–1938: Holy Cross
- 1939–1942: Iowa
- 1946–1949: Iowa
- 1950–1964: Holy Cross

Basketball
- 1923–1925: Columbia (IA)
- 1925–1929: DePaul

Head coaching record
- Overall: 201–128–15 (football); 25–23 (basketball)

Accomplishments and honors

Awards
- AFCA Coach of the Year (1939); First-team All-Pro (1922); Consensus All-American (1921); First-team All-American (1920)
- College Football Hall of Fame; Inducted in 1971 (profile)

Edward Nicholas Anderson (November 11, 1900 – April 24, 1974) was an American football player and coach of football and basketball. He served as the head football coach at Columbia College in Dubuque, Iowa, now known as Loras College (1922–1924), DePaul University (1925–1931), the College of the Holy Cross (1933–1938, 1950–1964), and the University of Iowa (1939–1942, 1946–1949), compiling a career college football record of 201–128–15. Anderson was also the head basketball coach at DePaul from 1925 to 1929, tallying a mark of 25–21 Anderson played professional football in the National Football League (NFL) for the Rochester Jeffersons in 1922 and the Chicago Cardinals from 1922 to 1925. He was inducted into the College Football Hall of Fame as a coach in 1971.

== Playing and early coaching career ==
Anderson attended Mason City High School in Mason City, Iowa, before enrolling at the University of Notre Dame. He played for Knute Rockne from 1918 to 1921 and was a teammate of George Gipp. As a senior, he was named a consensus first team All-American and was the team captain of the 1921 Notre Dame football team. In his final three years at Notre Dame, the Irish had a record of 28–1. Anderson's only loss in his final three seasons was to Anderson's home state school, when Notre Dame lost to the Iowa Hawkeyes in 1921, 10–7.

Anderson coached at Columbia College in Dubuque, Iowa, from 1922 to 1924, compiling a 16–6–1 record with one undefeated season. During that time, he was considered for an assistant coaching position at Iowa, but Iowa coach Howard Jones rejected the idea. Anderson served as a player/coach for the Chicago Cardinals (now Arizona Cardinals) professional football team in the early 1920s as well. He played on the Cardinals' controversial championship team in 1925.

That same year, Anderson enrolled at Rush Medical College in Chicago. While in Chicago, Anderson coached football at DePaul University, compiling a 21–22–3 record from 1925 to 1931. He also coached basketball at DePaul from 1925 to 1929, guiding them to a 25–21 record. After graduating from Rush, Anderson took a job as head football coach at the College of the Holy Cross in Massachusetts. He had a record of 47–7–4 in six years at Holy Cross from 1933 to 1938, including undefeated seasons in 1935 and 1937. During that time, Anderson also served as the head of eye, ear, nose, and throat clinic at Boston's Veterans Hospital.

== Coaching career at Iowa and military service ==
=== First stint ===
Anderson was hired as the 15th head football coach at the University of Iowa before the 1939 season. Iowa had a record of just 2–13–1 in 1937 and 1938 under Irl Tubbs, and the Hawkeyes had finished among the worst three teams in the Big Ten Conference standings every year in the 1930s except 1933. Iowa had won just one conference game in the last three years, and the team they beat, Chicago, announced that they would be dropping their football program following the 1939 season.

Anderson sought to change Iowa's fortunes immediately. He put the 85 football players who showed up for spring practice through an intense workout. Only 37 players would earn football letters in 1939 for Iowa. Anderson felt the 1939 team could be a good one if the starters played significant minutes. Before the first game, The Des Moines Register had a small note stating that "a set of iron men may be developed to play football for Iowa."

The 1939 Hawkeyes, nicknamed the "Ironmen", would become one of the greatest teams in school history and certainly the most romanticized. Led by Nile Kinnick, the 1939 Heisman Trophy winner, the Hawkeyes put together a 6–1–1 record, the best overall record in the Big Ten, though Ohio State edged out Iowa for the conference title. Many of Anderson's players played complete games during that season for the Hawkeyes. Anderson was named national coach of the year by several organizations. Jim Gallager of the Chicago Herald-American wrote, "It's doubtful if any coach in football history ever accomplished such an amazing renaissance as Eddie Anderson has worked at Iowa."

Anderson was given a Cadillac by Iowa fans and a bonus by the university after his performance during the 1939 season. He was also given a significant share of stock in Amana Refrigeration by the founder and CEO of the company, George Foersner, as a reward for his coaching that season. When Anderson retired from football in the late 1960s, he cashed in his stock for over a million dollars.

After two more average seasons, Iowa started the 1942 season with a 6–2 record and was in contention for the Big Ten title, but consecutive road conference losses at Minnesota and Michigan to end the season doomed Iowa's chances. After that season, Anderson took a leave of absence to serve in the U.S. Army Medical Corps during World War II. Iowa left the football program in the hands of interim coaches Slip Madigan and Clem Crowe while Anderson was gone from 1943 to 1945.

Anderson was a gifted doctor who performed at the University of Iowa Hospital in the morning before coaching in the afternoon. He had been studying urology under the Head of Urology at the hospital. When Anderson returned in 1946, he was told that if he retired from coaching, he would be named the successor to Dr. Alcock. Anderson turned down the request and continued practicing medicine on a part-time basis.

=== Second stint ===
By the time Anderson had returned from the service, Iowa football was again in the cellar of the Big Ten. Before the 1946 season, Anderson was hospitalized for 19 days with a parasite infection. He returned to lead Iowa to four wins in their first five games, which was as many wins as Iowa had during his three-year absence. Still, Iowa slumped to a 5–4 final record, leading two former players to write a scathing editorial about Anderson. The editorial asked, "How long will Dr. Anderson ride on the laurels that Nile Kinnick won for him?"

In 1947, a 2–2–1 start was followed by three straight losses. One day before Iowa's final game at Minnesota, Anderson submitted his resignation at Iowa, citing "considerable loose talk" among Iowa fans as one reason. The Hawkeye football team responded with a powerful effort against Minnesota, defeating the Gophers, 13–7. Fans begged Anderson to reconsider, and the Iowa athletic board denied his resignation, promising him a larger coaching staff and other football improvement s. Anderson decided to stay, saying, "I'm glad we got things straightened out." Anderson used his larger coaching staff to hire Leonard Raffensperger as the head of the freshman team.

After two more average seasons in 1948 and 1949, Anderson was approached again by Holy Cross, which now had a coaching vacancy. Ohio State made a rare concession and offered their football coach faculty tenure, so Anderson made the same request to Iowa athletic director Paul Brechler. Brechler could not promise Anderson anything, so Anderson resigned and took the head coaching position at Holy Cross. He had a 35–33–2 record in eight years at Iowa.

== Later life, death, and honors ==
Anderson returned to Holy Cross, where he coached 15 more years from 1950 to 1964. He posted a record of 82–60–4 in his second stay at Holy Cross. For his career, he coached 39 seasons at four schools and compiled a record of 201–128–15. He was the fourth coach in college football history to reach 200 wins.

After resigning at Holy Cross in 1964, Anderson was named the chief of outpatient services at the Veterans Administration Medical Center in Rutland, Massachusetts. He also served a school for mentally ill children. Anderson later moved to Clearwater, Florida before dying of a heart attack in 1974.

Anderson was inducted into the Iowa Sports Hall of Fame in 1962 and the College Football Hall of Fame in 1971. Anderson gave the acceptance speech for that year's class at the College Football Hall of Fame. He summarized his coaching philosophy when he said, "The victory most savored and cherished is the one that didn't come about by beating the rules, but by playing within them, where defeat is only a condition of the moment."

In 1999, Sports Illustrated selected Eddie Anderson as the 45th greatest sports figure in the history of the state of Iowa.

== Head coaching record ==
=== Football ===
| Year | Team | Overall | Conference | Standing | Bowl/playoffs | Coaches^{#} | AP^{°} |
|---|---|---|---|---|---|---|---|
Columbia Duhawks (Independent) (1922–1924)
| 1922 | Columbia | 7–0 | | | | | |
| 1923 | Columbia | 4–4–1 | | | | | |
| 1924 | Columbia | 5–2–1 | | | | | |
| Columbia: | | 16–6–2 | | | | | |
DePaul Blue Demons (Independent) (1925–1931)
| 1925 | DePaul | 5–1–1 | | | | | |
| 1926 | DePaul | 3–2 | | | | | |
| 1927 | DePaul | 1–5–1 | | | | | |
| 1928 | DePaul | 1–4–1 | | | | | |
| 1929 | DePaul | 2–4 | | | | | |
| 1930 | DePaul | 3–2 | | | | | |
| 1931 | DePaul | 6–3 | | | | | |
| DePaul: | | 21–22–3 | | | | | |
Holy Cross Crusaders (Independent) (1933–1938)
| 1933 | Holy Cross | 7–2 | | | | | |
| 1934 | Holy Cross | 8–2 | | | | | |
| 1935 | Holy Cross | 9–0–1 | | | | | |
| 1936 | Holy Cross | 7–2–1 | | | | | |
| 1937 | Holy Cross | 8–0–2 | | | | | 14 |
| 1938 | Holy Cross | 8–1 | | | | | 9 |
Iowa Hawkeyes (Big Ten Conference) (1939–1942)
| 1939 | Iowa | 6–1–1 | 4–1–1 | 2nd | | | 9 |
| 1940 | Iowa | 4–4 | 2–3 | T–6th | | | |
| 1941 | Iowa | 3–5 | 2–4 | 6th | | | |
| 1942 | Iowa | 6–4 | 3–3 | T–5th | | | |
Iowa Hawkeyes (Big Ten Conference) (1946–1949)
| 1946 | Iowa | 5–4 | 3–3 | 4th | | | |
| 1947 | Iowa | 3–5–1 | 2–3–1 | T–6th | | | |
| 1948 | Iowa | 4–5 | 2–4 | T–5th | | | |
| 1949 | Iowa | 4–5 | 3–3 | T–5th | | | |
| Iowa: | | 35–33–2 | 21–24–2 | | | | |
Holy Cross Crusaders (NCAA University Division independent) (1950–1964)
| 1950 | Holy Cross | 4–5–1 | | | | | |
| 1951 | Holy Cross | 8–2 | | | | 17 | 19 |
| 1952 | Holy Cross | 8–2 | | | | | |
| 1953 | Holy Cross | 5–5 | | | | | |
| 1954 | Holy Cross | 3–7 | | | | | |
| 1955 | Holy Cross | 6–4 | | | | | |
| 1956 | Holy Cross | 5–3–1 | | | | | |
| 1957 | Holy Cross | 5–3–1 | | | | | |
| 1958 | Holy Cross | 6–3 | | | | | |
| 1959 | Holy Cross | 6–4 | | | | | |
| 1960 | Holy Cross | 6–4 | | | | | |
| 1961 | Holy Cross | 7–3 | | | | | |
| 1962 | Holy Cross | 6–4 | | | | | |
| 1963 | Holy Cross | 2–6–1 | | | | | |
| 1964 | Holy Cross | 5–5 | | | | | |
| Holy Cross: | | 129–67–8 | | | | | |
| Total: | | 201–128–15 | | | | | |
^{#}Rankings from final Coaches Poll.; ^{°}Rankings from final AP Poll.

== See also ==
- List of college football career coaching wins leaders
- List of college football head coaches with non-consecutive tenure
