= Western Interstate Conference =

Midwestern American intercollegiate athletic conference

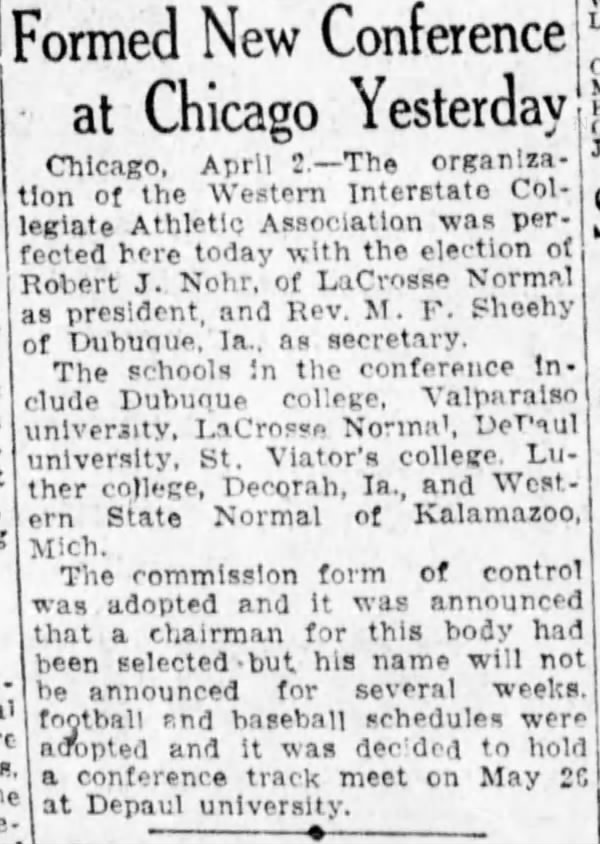
The Western Interstate Conference was formed on April 2, 1923 in Chicago according to The Pantagraph.

The Western Interstate Conference was a short-lived intercollegiate athletic conference that existed in the Midwestern United States from 1923 to 1927. The league had members in Illinois, Iowa, Indiana, Wisconsin, and Michigan.

== 1923 founding members ==
- Columbia College (Dubuque)
- Valparaiso University
- La Crosse State Normal School
- DePaul University
- St. Viator College
- Luther College (Iowa)
- Western State Normal School

== Football champions ==
- 1923 – N/A
- 1924 – Columbia (IA)
- 1925 – DePaul
- 1926 – DePaul
- 1927 – St. Viator

== See also ==
- List of defunct college football conferences
