= Frank Haggerty =

American football, basketball, and baseball coach

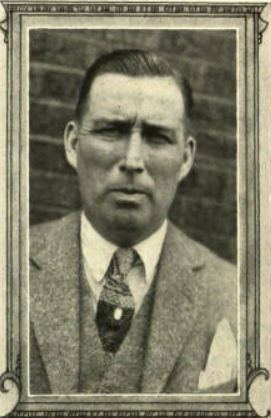
- Haggerty as the co-head coach of the 1923 DePaul Blue Demons football team

Biographical details
- Born: c. 1876
- Died: September 19, 1962 (aged 86); Chicago, Illinois, U.S.

Playing career

Football
- 1899–1900: Colby

Baseball
- 1899: Colby
- Positions: Halfback (football); First baseman (baseball)

Coaching career (HC unless noted)

Football
- 1904–1906: St. Vincent's (CA)
- 1907–1908: St. Vincent's (IL)
- 1910–1914: Buchtel/Akron
- 1918: Great Lakes Navy (assistant)
- 1921–1922: DePaul

Basketball
- 1910–1915: Buchtel/Akron

Baseball
- 1906–1907: St. Vincent's (CA)
- 1910–1915: Buchtel/Akron
- 1923: DePaul

Head coaching record
- Overall: 22–16–3 (football, Akron only); 30–23 (basketball); 33–23 (baseball)

Francis J. Haggerty (c. 1876 – September 19, 1962) was an American college football, college basketball, and college baseball coach. He served as the head football coach at the University of Akron—known as Buchtel College until 1913—for five seasons from 1910 to 1914, compiling a record of 22–16–3. Haggerty also coached the men's basketball team at Akron those five academic years, 1910–1915, tallying a mark of 30–23. He was also the head baseball coach at St. Vincent's College, now Loyola Marymount University, from 1906 to 1907, at Buchtel/Akron from 1910 to 1913 and again in 1915, and at DePaul University in 1923, amassing a career college baseball record of 33–23.

Haggerty attended Phillips Exeter Academy in Exeter, New Hampshire and then Colby College, where competed in football, basketball, baseball, and track and field. He later earned a degree from the University of North Dakota School of Law and practice law in California. Haggerty died from cancer, at the age of 86, on September 19, 1962, at his home in Chicago. He was buried in the Memorial Park Cemetery in Skokie.

== Head coaching record ==
=== Football ===
Year	Team	Overall	Conference	Standing	Bowl/playoffs
St. Vincent's / DePaul Blue Demons (Independent) (1907–1908)
1907	St. Vincent's	5–2			
1908	DePaul	7–0–1			
St. Vincent's / DePaul:		12–2–1			
Buchtel/Akron (Independent) (1910–1914)
1910	Buchtel	7–2			
1911	Buchtel	3–4–1			
1912	Buchtel	5–2–1			
1913	Akron	3–4			
1914	Akron	4–4–1			
Buchtel/Akron:		22–16–3			
Total:					

=== Basketball ===
Record table
Season	Team	Overall	Conference	Standing	Postseason
Buchtel/Akron (Independent) (1910–1915)
1910–11	Buchtel	8–4			
1911–12	Buchtel	6–3			
1912–13	Buchtel	7–1			
1913–14	Akron	6–6			
1914–15	Akron	3–9			
Buchtel/Akron:		30–23			
Total:		30–23			
