= Harry F. Adams =

American college sports coach (1895–1977)

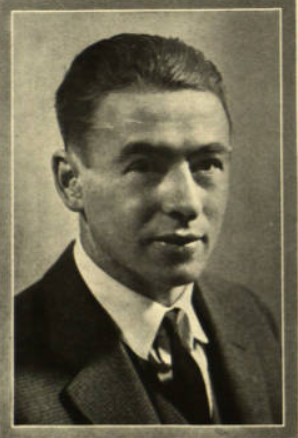
- Adams, c. 1925

Biographical details
- Born: December 4, 1895; Sacramento, Kentucky, U.S.
- Died: November 24, 1977 (aged 81); Missoula, Montana, U.S.

Playing career

Football
- 1915–1918: Montana

Basketball
- 1915–1916: Montana
- 1919–1921: Montana

Track and field
- c. 1920: Montana
- Positions: Quarterback (football); Center (basketball)

Coaching career (HC unless noted)

Football
- 1921–1923: Montana (assistant/freshmen)
- 1924: DePaul
- 1925–1942: Montana (backfield)

Basketball
- 1921–1924: Montana (freshmen)
- 1924–1925: DePaul

Track and field
- 1921–1924: Montana (freshmen)
- 1925–1933: Montana (assistant)
- 1933–1942: Montana
- 1945–1966: Montana

Administrative career (AD unless noted)
- 1953–1966: Montana (assistant AD)

Head coaching record
- Overall: 5–4–1 (football); 6–13 (basketball)

Harry Franks Adams (December 4, 1895 – November 24, 1977) was an American college sports coach during the first half of the 20th century. He was most notably the head coach of the track and field team for the University of Montana for over 35 years.

== Biography ==
After attending Weatherwax High School in Aberdeen, Washington, Adams became a student at the State University of Montana, later the University of Montana, in 1915 where he played multiple sports. Adams was named All-Conference quarterback three times and played center for the basketball team for two seasons under Jerry Nissen. He briefly ran for the track and field team before leaving to fight in the First World War. He later became an assistant coach for all three sports between 1921 and 1924 before serving a short tenure at DePaul University in Chicago. He was the head coach of the basketball team from 1924 to 1925, guiding them to a 6–13 record. He was additionally head coach of the 1924 Blue Demons football team, guiding them to a 5–4–1 record.

Adams returned to Montana in 1925 as an assistant coach for both the track and field and football team. He was elevated to the position of head coach of the track and field team in 1933. He continued coaching until World War II where he served in the Army, reaching the rank of colonel. Returning after the war, he continued his work as head coach and additionally did scouting for the football team until 1948. He was named to the Helms Athletic Foundation Track and Field Hall of Fame in 1961. Following his retirement in 1966, the multi-purpose arena known as "The Fieldhouse" was renamed Harry Adams Field House in his honor until 1999. Adams coached seven Montana All-Americans, including Doug Brown. He was inducted into the Grizzly Sports Hall of Fame in 1993.

Adams died on November 24, 1977, at Community Nursing Home in Missoula, Montana.

== Head coaching record ==
=== Football ===
Year	Team	Overall	Conference	Standing	Bowl/playoffs
DePaul Blue Demons (Independent) (1924–sing)
1924	DePaul	5–4–1			
DePaul:		5–4–1			
Total:		5–4–1			

=== Basketball ===
Record table
Season	Team	Overall	Conference	Standing	Postseason
DePaul Blue Demons (Independent) (1924–1925)
1924–25	DePaul	6–13			
DePaul:		6–13			
Total:		6–13			
