= Tom Haggerty =

American basketball coach

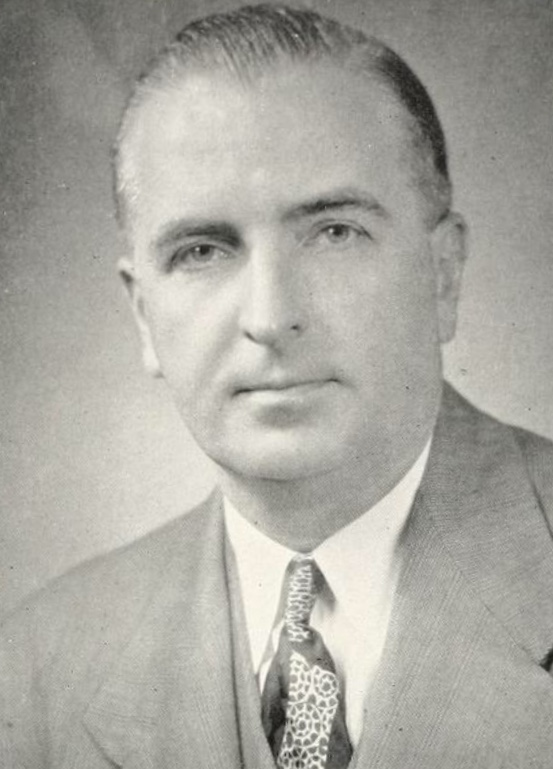
- Haggerty from the 1950 Loyolan

Biographical details
- Born: October 31, 1903
- Died: January 14, 1956 (aged 52); New Orleans, Louisiana, U.S.

Coaching career (HC unless noted)
- 1936–1940: DePaul
- 1945–1950: Loyola (IL)
- 1950–1953: Loyola (LA)

Administrative career (AD unless noted)
- 1944–1945: DePaul
- 1945–1950: Loyola (IL)

Thomas J. Haggerty (October 31, 1903 − January 14, 1956) was an American college basketball coach. He coached DePaul University to a record of 64–29 from 1936 to 1940, and after a stint in the United States Army, returned to the school in 1944 to become its athletic director. From 1945 to 1950, he coached Loyola University Chicago to a record of 111–41, and guided them to a second-place finish in the 1949 National Invitation Tournament. He later coached at Loyola University New Orleans, but resigned during the 1953–54 season because of health issues. He died of pneumonia at age 51 on January 14, 1956.
