= 1911–12 NCAA men's basketball season =

Men's collegiate basketball season

- Helms National Champions: Wisconsin (retroactive selection in 1943)
- Player of the Year (Helms): Otto Stangel, Wisconsin (retroactive selection in 1944)

The 1911–12 NCAA men's basketball season began in December 1911, progressed through the regular season, and concluded in March 1912.

== Season headlines ==
- In February 1943, the Helms Athletic Foundation retroactively selected Wisconsin as its national champion for the 1911–12 season.
- In 1995, the Premo-Porretta Power Poll retroactively selected Wisconsin as its top-ranked team for the 1911–12 season.

== Conference membership changes ==
School	Former Conference	New Conference
Dartmouth Big Green	Independent	Eastern Intercollegiate Basketball League
Ohio State Buckeyes	Independent	Western Conference

== Regular season ==
=== Conferences ===
==== Conference winners ====
Conference	Regular Season Winner	Conference Player of the Year	Conference Tournament	Tournament Venue (City)	Tournament Winner
Eastern Intercollegiate Basketball League	Columbia	None selected	No Tournament		
Missouri Valley Intercollegiate Athletic Association	Nebraska (North) & Kansas (South)	None selected	No Tournament; Nebraska and Kansas were conference co-champions		
Rocky Mountain Athletic Conference	Colorado Mines		No Tournament		
Western Conference	Purdue & Wisconsin	None selected	No Tournament		

==== Conference standings ====
1911–12 Eastern Intercollegiate Basketball League standings
	Conf.				Overall
Team	W		L	PCT	W		L	PCT
Columbia	8	–	2	.800	10	–	2	.833
Dartmouth	7	–	3	.700	9	–	5	.643
Penn	6	–	4	.600	10	–	7	.588
Cornell	5	–	5	.500	6	–	7	.462
Princeton	3	–	7	.300	8	–	8	.500
Yale	1	–	9	.100	1	–	9	.100

1911–12 Rocky Mountain Conference standings
	Conf.				Overall
Team	W		L	PCT	W		L	PCT
Colorado Mines	5	–	0	1.000	6	–	1	.857
Colorado	2	–	2	.500	5	–	2	.714
Denver	1	–	3	.250	6	–	4	.600
Colorado Agricultural	1	–	4	.200	3	–	5	.375

1911–12 Missouri Valley Intercollegiate Athletic Association men's basketball standings
	Conf.				Overall
Team	W		L	PCT	W		L	PCT
North Division
Nebraska†	8	–	0	1.000	14	–	1	.933
Iowa State	4	–	4	.500	8	–	7	.533
Drake	0	–	8	.000	2	–	11	.154
South Division
Kansas†	6	–	2	.750	11	–	7	.611
Washington University	5	–	3	.625	8	–	5	.615
Missouri	1	–	7	.125	5	–	10	.333
† Conference co-championship winner

1911–12 Western Conference men's basketball standings
	Conf.				Overall
Team	W		L	PCT	W		L	PCT
Wisconsin†	12	–	0	1.000	15	–	0	1.000
Purdue†	10	–	0	1.000	12	–	0	1.000
Chicago	7	–	5	.583	12	–	6	.667
Minnesota	6	–	6	.500	7	–	6	.538
Illinois	4	–	8	.333	8	–	8	.500
Indiana	2	–	9	.182	6	–	11	.353
Iowa	0	–	4	.000	6	–	8	.429
Northwestern	0	–	8	.000	4	–	9	.308
Ohio State	0	–	0	–	7	–	5	.583
† Conference co-championship winner

=== Independents ===
A total of 112 college teams played as major independents. Among independents that played at least 10 games, Baylor (13–0), Dayton (13–0), Grove City (12–0), and Wesleyan (13–0) were undefeated, and Santa Clara (18–6) finished with the most wins.

1911–12 NCAA men's basketball independents standings
	Conf.				Overall
Team	W		L	PCT	W		L	PCT
Baylor		–		–	13	–	0	1.000
Brigham Young		–		–	7	–	0	1.000
California		–		–	2	–	0	1.000
Clemson		–		–	4	–	0	1.000
Dayton		–		–	13	–	0	1.000
Grove City		–		–	12	–	0	1.000
Kentucky		–		–	9	–	0	1.000
Mississippi A&M		–		–	9	–	0	1.000
Wesleyan (Conn.)		–		–	13	–	0	1.000
Allegheny		–		–	11	–	1	.917
Swarthmore		–		–	11	–	1	.917
Navy		–		–	8	–	1	.889
Notre Dame		–		–	16	–	2	.889
North Dakota		–		–	13	–	2	.867
Trinity (N.C.)		–		–	6	–	1	.857
Georgia		–		–	6	–	1	.857
Oregon		–		–	12	–	2	.857
Springfield (Mass.)		–		–	6	–	1	.857
Lake Forest		–		–	11	–	2	.846
Oregon Agricultural		–		–	16	–	3	.842
Ole Miss		–		–	10	–	2	.833
Texas		–		–	8	–	1	.889
CCNY		–		–	9	–	2	.818
Nebraska Wesleyan		–		–	9	–	2	.818
Arizona State–Tempe		–		–	8	–	2	.800
Michigan State		–		–	12	–	3	.800
St. Lawrence		–		–	12	–	3	.800
Creighton		–		–	15	–	4	.789
North Central		–		–	11	–	3	.786
Syracuse		–		–	11	–	3	.786
Oklahoma		–		–	7	–	2	.778
Beloit		–		–	6	–	2	.750
Montana State		–		–	6	–	2	.750
Oberlin		–		–	9	–	3	.750
Santa Clara		–		–	18	–	6	.750
St. John's (N.Y.)		–		–	15	–	5	.750
Washington		–		–	12	–	4	.750
Loyola (Md.)		–		–	11	–	4	.733
North Dakota Agricultural		–		–	8	–	3	.727
Wooster		–		–	8	–	3	.727
Canisius		–		–	10	–	4	.714
Franklin		–		–	10	–	4	.714
Lehigh		–		–	10	–	4	.714
Roanoke		–		–	5	–	2	.714
Utah		–		–	5	–	2	.714
Kalamazoo		–		–	7	–	3	.700
Washburn		–		–	11	–	5	.688
Akron		–		–	6	–	3	.667
Army		–		–	8	–	4	.667
Connecticut		–		–	6	–	3	.667
Davidson		–		–	4	–	2	.667
Kansas State		–		–	10	–	5	.667
Manhattan		–		–	12	–	6	.667
Millikin		–		–	10	–	5	.667
Virginia Tech		–		–	6	–	3	.667
Bradley		–		–	11	–	6	.647
Georgetown		–		–	11	–	6	.647
Southern California		–		–	9	–	5	.643
Carleton		–		–	7	–	4	.636
Virginia		–		–	7	–	4	.636
Bucknell		–		–	10	–	6	.625
Penn State		–		–	8	–	5	.615
Union (N.Y.)		–		–	8	–	5	.615
Washington and Lee		–		–	8	–	5	.615
Seton Hall		–		–	9	–	6	.600
Wake Forest		–		–	9	–	6	.600
Hope		–		–	9	–	6	.600
Rhode Island State		–		–	4	–	3	.571
Fordham		–		–	17	–	13	.567
Gettysburg		–		–	9	–	7	.563
Northern Colorado		–		–	5	–	4	.556
Wabash		–		–	5	–	4	.556
Detroit		–		–	6	–	5	.545
VMI		–		–	6	–	5	.545
Colgate		–		–	7	–	6	.538
Indiana State		–		–	8	–	6	.571
Pittsburgh		–		–	10	–	9	.526
Niagara		–		–	11	–	10	.524
Arizona		–		–	2	–	2	.500
Augustana (Ill.)		–		–	7	–	7	.500
Butler		–		–	5	–	5	.500
Denison		–		–	5	–	5	.500
Saint Mary's (Calif.)		–		–	1	–	1	.500
Temple		–		–	4	–	4	.500
Tennessee		–		–	5	–	5	.500
Vanderbilt		–		–	9	–	9	.500
Brown		–		–	6	–	7	.462
Wyoming		–		–	5	–	6	.455
North Carolina		–		–	4	–	5	.444
Marietta		–		–	6	–	8	.429
South Carolina		–		–	3	–	4	.429
LSU		–		–	4	–	6	.400
Mount Union		–		–	4	–	8	.333
New Mexico		–		–	1	–	2	.333
Southwestern (Kan.)		–		–	5	–	10	.333
Wisconsin–Stevens Point		–		–	2	–	4	.333
Miami (Ohio)		–		–	3	–	7	.300
Washington State		–		–	5	–	12	.294
William & Mary		–		–	2	–	5	.286
Auburn		–		–	2	–	6	.250
Oklahoma A&M		–		–	2	–	6	.250
Utah State		–		–	2	–	6	.250
St. Joseph's		–		–	6	–	22	.214
Fairmount		–		–	2	–	8	.200
Cincinnati		–		–	2	–	9	.182
Ohio		–		–	2	–	9	.182
Delaware		–		–	2	–	10	.167
Montana		–		–	1	–	5	.167
Millsaps		–		–	1	–	8	.111
New York University		–		–	1	–	12	.077
Idaho		–		–	1	–	13	.071
Louisville		–		–	0	–	3	.000

== Awards ==
=== Helms College Basketball All-Americans ===
The practice of selecting a Consensus All-American Team did not begin until the 1928–29 season. The Helms Athletic Foundation later retroactively selected a list of All-Americans for the 1911–12 season.

Player	Team
Claus Benson	Columbia
Thomas Canfield	St. Lawrence
Lewis Castle	Syracuse
Fred Gieg	Swarthmore
Ernst Mensel	Dartmouth
Emil Schradieck	Colgate
Alphonse Schumacher	Dayton
Rufus Sisson	Dartmouth
Otto Stangel	Wisconsin
William Turner	Penn

=== Major player of the year awards ===
- Helms Player of the Year: Eddie Calder, St. Lawrence (retroactive selection in 1944)

== Coaching changes ==
A number of teams changed coaches during the season and after it ended.

Team	Former Coach	Interim Coach	New Coach	Reason
Arizona	Frank L. Kleeberger		Raymond L. Quigley	
Bucknell	C. Fulmer		H. E. Zehner	
Butler	Bill Diddle		G. Cullen Thomas	
Cornell	Paul Sternberg		Albert Sharpe	
Dartmouth	Francis Brady		James Mullen	
Denver	Clem Crowley		Hiram Wilson	
Drake	A. R. Hackett		John L. Griffith	
Trinity (N.C.)	Wilbur Wade Card		Joseph Brinn	
Illinois	Thomas E. Thompson		Ralph Jones	
Indiana	James Kase		Art Powell	
Indiana State	Bertram Wiggins		Alfred Westphal	
Iowa	Walter Stewart		Floyd Thomas	
Kentucky	Edwin Sweetland		John J. Tigert	
Lehigh	J. W. H. Pollard		Tom Keady	
Manhattan	Edward Hanrahan		Fred J. Murphy	
Miami (OH)	F. W. Stone		M. Hoskins	
Nay	George F. Jacobs		Louis Wenzell	
North Dakota	David L. Dunlap		Charles Armstrong	
Northwestern	Charles Hammett		Dennis Grady	
Ohio	Arthur Hinaman		C. M. Douthit	
Penn	Charles Keinath		Arthur Kiefaber	
Princeton	Harry Hough		Fred Luehring	
Purdue	Ralph Jones		Robert E. Vaughn	Jones left to coach at Illinois.
Texas	J. Burton Rix		Carl Taylor	
Southern California	Walter Hall		J. S. Robson	
St. John's	Joseph O'Shea		Claude Allen	
Vanderbilt	Zeke Martin		Oscar G. Nelson	
Virginia Tech	L. N. Keesling		Houston Hughes	
Wyoming	Harold I. Dean		Leon Exelby	
Yale	R. B. Hyatt		Pop Foster	
