= 1911–12 North Carolina Tar Heels men's basketball team =

American college basketball season

1911–12 North Carolina Tar Heels men's basketball
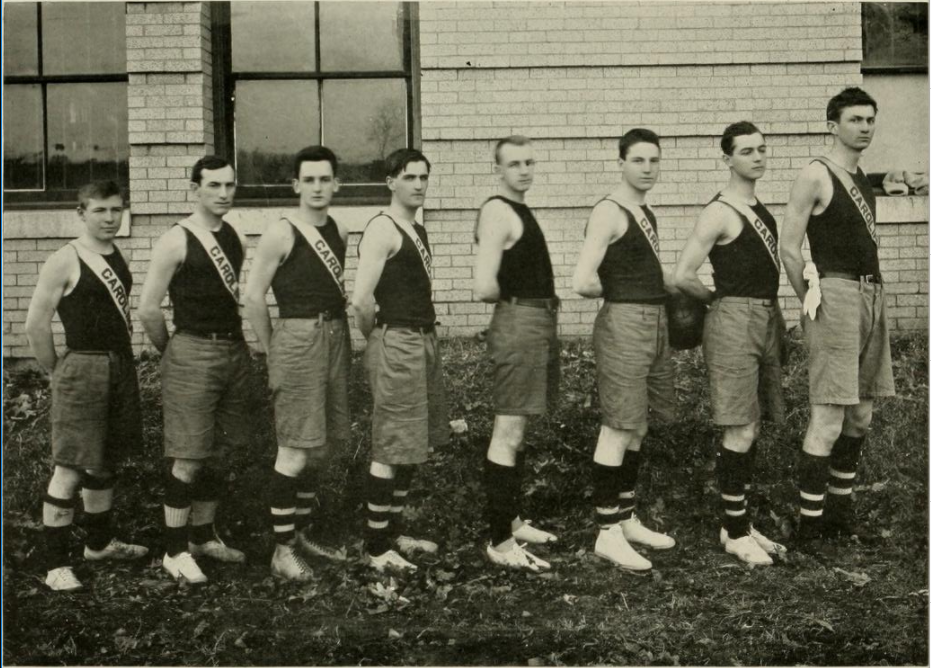
- Conference: Independent
- Record: 4–5
- Head coach: Nathaniel Cartmell (2nd season)
- Captain: Junius Smith
- Home arena: Bynum Gymnasium

1911–12 NCAA men's basketball independents standings
	Conf.				Overall
Team	W		L	PCT	W		L	PCT
Baylor		–		–	13	–	0	1.000
Brigham Young		–		–	7	–	0	1.000
California		–		–	2	–	0	1.000
Clemson		–		–	4	–	0	1.000
Dayton		–		–	13	–	0	1.000
Grove City		–		–	12	–	0	1.000
Kentucky		–		–	9	–	0	1.000
Mississippi A&M		–		–	9	–	0	1.000
Wesleyan (Conn.)		–		–	13	–	0	1.000
Allegheny		–		–	11	–	1	.917
Swarthmore		–		–	11	–	1	.917
Navy		–		–	8	–	1	.889
Notre Dame		–		–	16	–	2	.889
North Dakota		–		–	13	–	2	.867
Trinity (N.C.)		–		–	6	–	1	.857
Georgia		–		–	6	–	1	.857
Oregon		–		–	12	–	2	.857
Springfield (Mass.)		–		–	6	–	1	.857
Lake Forest		–		–	11	–	2	.846
Oregon Agricultural		–		–	16	–	3	.842
Ole Miss		–		–	10	–	2	.833
Texas		–		–	8	–	1	.889
CCNY		–		–	9	–	2	.818
Nebraska Wesleyan		–		–	9	–	2	.818
Arizona State–Tempe		–		–	8	–	2	.800
Michigan State		–		–	12	–	3	.800
St. Lawrence		–		–	12	–	3	.800
Creighton		–		–	15	–	4	.789
North Central		–		–	11	–	3	.786
Syracuse		–		–	11	–	3	.786
Oklahoma		–		–	7	–	2	.778
Beloit		–		–	6	–	2	.750
Montana State		–		–	6	–	2	.750
Oberlin		–		–	9	–	3	.750
Santa Clara		–		–	18	–	6	.750
St. John's (N.Y.)		–		–	15	–	5	.750
Washington		–		–	12	–	4	.750
Loyola (Md.)		–		–	11	–	4	.733
North Dakota Agricultural		–		–	8	–	3	.727
Wooster		–		–	8	–	3	.727
Canisius		–		–	10	–	4	.714
Franklin		–		–	10	–	4	.714
Lehigh		–		–	10	–	4	.714
Roanoke		–		–	5	–	2	.714
Utah		–		–	5	–	2	.714
Kalamazoo		–		–	7	–	3	.700
Washburn		–		–	11	–	5	.688
Akron		–		–	6	–	3	.667
Army		–		–	8	–	4	.667
Connecticut		–		–	6	–	3	.667
Davidson		–		–	4	–	2	.667
Kansas State		–		–	10	–	5	.667
Manhattan		–		–	12	–	6	.667
Millikin		–		–	10	–	5	.667
Virginia Tech		–		–	6	–	3	.667
Bradley		–		–	11	–	6	.647
Georgetown		–		–	11	–	6	.647
Southern California		–		–	9	–	5	.643
Carleton		–		–	7	–	4	.636
Virginia		–		–	7	–	4	.636
Bucknell		–		–	10	–	6	.625
Penn State		–		–	8	–	5	.615
Union (N.Y.)		–		–	8	–	5	.615
Washington and Lee		–		–	8	–	5	.615
Seton Hall		–		–	9	–	6	.600
Wake Forest		–		–	9	–	6	.600
Hope		–		–	9	–	6	.600
Rhode Island State		–		–	4	–	3	.571
Fordham		–		–	17	–	13	.567
Gettysburg		–		–	9	–	7	.563
Northern Colorado		–		–	5	–	4	.556
Wabash		–		–	5	–	4	.556
Detroit		–		–	6	–	5	.545
VMI		–		–	6	–	5	.545
Colgate		–		–	7	–	6	.538
Indiana State		–		–	8	–	6	.571
Pittsburgh		–		–	10	–	9	.526
Niagara		–		–	11	–	10	.524
Arizona		–		–	2	–	2	.500
Augustana (Ill.)		–		–	7	–	7	.500
Butler		–		–	5	–	5	.500
Denison		–		–	5	–	5	.500
Saint Mary's (Calif.)		–		–	1	–	1	.500
Temple		–		–	4	–	4	.500
Tennessee		–		–	5	–	5	.500
Vanderbilt		–		–	9	–	9	.500
Brown		–		–	6	–	7	.462
Wyoming		–		–	5	–	6	.455
North Carolina		–		–	4	–	5	.444
Marietta		–		–	6	–	8	.429
South Carolina		–		–	3	–	4	.429
LSU		–		–	4	–	6	.400
Mount Union		–		–	4	–	8	.333
New Mexico		–		–	1	–	2	.333
Southwestern (Kan.)		–		–	5	–	10	.333
Wisconsin–Stevens Point		–		–	2	–	4	.333
Miami (Ohio)		–		–	3	–	7	.300
Washington State		–		–	5	–	12	.294
William & Mary		–		–	2	–	5	.286
Auburn		–		–	2	–	6	.250
Oklahoma A&M		–		–	2	–	6	.250
Utah State		–		–	2	–	6	.250
St. Joseph's		–		–	6	–	22	.214
Fairmount		–		–	2	–	8	.200
Cincinnati		–		–	2	–	9	.182
Ohio		–		–	2	–	9	.182
Delaware		–		–	2	–	10	.167
Montana		–		–	1	–	5	.167
Millsaps		–		–	1	–	8	.111
New York University		–		–	1	–	12	.077
Idaho		–		–	1	–	13	.071
Louisville		–		–	0	–	3	.000

The 1911–12 North Carolina Tar Heels men's basketball team (variously "North Carolina", "Carolina" or "Tar Heels") was the second varsity college basketball team to represent the University of North Carolina. (Note: The school was known as the University of North Carolina until February 1963.) After the first season, it was announced that star player and captain Marvin Ritch was named manager for the upcoming year's team. He assumed scheduling duties and released a tentative schedule in December. Newspaper outlets deemed it to be one of the toughest schedules to be played. However, before the start of the semester and college basketball season, Ritch left the team to work as a secretary for Congressman Edwin Y. Webb.

North Carolina opened the season at home with a five-game home-stand, the first of which came against the Durham Y.M.C.A. The Tar Heels led for majority of the match, only to lose the game in the closing minutes. Carolina then squared off against Elon College and William & Mary, which the Tar Heels won the former handily and played a closer game in the latter. A physically larger Guilford College faced Carolina next. Guilford emerged victorious 35–20 in a game marred by many foul calls. After beating Virginia Christian, North Carolina dropped the next three games. Their loss against Virginia Agricultural and Mechanical College and Polytechnic Institute (V.P.I.) was attended by over 2,000 people. The team closed the season beating Wake Forest. The Tar Heels established a large lead in the early second half and went scoreless for the game's remainder. The Alumni Review reported after the V.P.I. game that "... basketball has come into its own in this state."

== Roster and schedule ==
After the conclusion of the Tar Heels' inaugural season, the school's Athletic Association announced the previous season's leading scorer Marvin Ritch as team manager, along with teammate William Tillet as his assistant. He assumed the duties of putting together the schedule for the upcoming season. In October, Ritch returned to his home in Charlotte, North Carolina, where he told the newspapers that he felt North Carolina's team would be the best in the state. In mid-December, a tentative schedule was made public that featured 17 games between January 5 and February 29. Writers from the student run newspaper The Tar Heel commented on the schedule saying it was "... one of the longest and hardest ever attempted by a North Carolina College." The games against the Charlotte Y.M.C.A. and Guilford College were thought to be early tests before the team travels north into Virginia and around Washington D.C. to play the likes of Georgetown, Virginia, and V.P.I., which were all thought to be difficult opponents. Wilmington's The Morning Star felt the schedule was tough, stating the team would have to "hustle some." In particular, they viewed the three schedule games against Virginia to be the "big feature" and the writers expected the attendance and crowd involvement to be similar to the school's match-ups in football and baseball. The final slate of games differed from the tentative schedule and did not feature the three proposed games against Virginia, a second game against V.P.I., and the single games against Georgetown, Catholic University, Davidson, and Roanoke College.

Prior to the season, Ritch was also unanimously re-elected as captain of the basketball team. On December 18, 1911, The Charlotte News reported that Ritch again returned to Charlotte and told the press that he "may not be able to return to 'the Hill' in the spring." The writers commented that if he did not, the basketball team would suffer in his absence. Before the season opened on January 5, The Evening Post confirmed Ritch's absence as they announced his appointment to be the private secretary for North Carolina Representative Edwin Y. Webb in Washington D.C. (Note: Ritch later enrolled at law school at Georgetown University and competed for their football team in the 1912 season.) According to The Morning Star, Ritch leaving led to a "distinct dismay among the student body." Junius Smith was named captain upon Ritch's departure.

1911–12 North Carolina Tar Heels roster (Note: Hanes (Forward) was listed as a starter for both the Elon and William & Mary games. In addition, Spencer (Guard) and Wakeley (Center) were players As Carolina players who played in the game as well. Jones (Guard) participated in the Tar Heels' games against Guilford and Virginia Christian. However, none of these players are listed on the roster in the Carolina Basketball 2018-19 Facts & Records Book.)
Name	Position	Height	Year	Hometown
George Carrington	C	6–3	Junior	Durham, North Carolina
Lenoir Chambers	G	5–11	Sophomore	Charlotte, North Carolina
Roy Erwin	G, F	5–9	Sophomore	Bell Buckle, Tennessee
Cyrus Long	G, F	5–10	Sophomore	Charlotte, North Carolina
Roy McKnight	F, C	6–0	Sophomore	Charlotte, North Carolina (Note: Roy McKnight's hometown is listed as Charlotte, North Carolina in the 1911 Yackety Yack, while it is listed as Chapel Hill, North Carolina in the Carolina Basketball 2018-19 Facts & Records Book.)
Junius Smith	F	6–2	Sophomore	Charlotte, North Carolina
Lewis Stein	F	5–9	Freshman	Wilmington, North Carolina
William "Bill" Tillett	F	5–6	Junior	Charlotte, North Carolina

Schedule
Date time, TV	Opponent	Result	Record	Site city, state
Regular season
January 5, 1912*	Durham Y.M.C.A.	L 18–29	0–1	Bynum Gymnasium; Chapel Hill, North Carolina
January 9, 1912*	Elon College	W 36–5	1–1	Bynum Gymnasium; Chapel Hill, North Carolina
January 12, 1912*	William & Mary	W 30–22 (Note: The score for the William & Mary game has been reported to be 30–22, while one source indicates it was 35–21.)	2–1	Bynum Gymnasium; Chapel Hill, North Carolina
January 31, 1912*	Guilford College	L 20–35	2–2	Bynum Gymnasium; Chapel Hill, North Carolina
February 2, 1912*	Virginia Christian	W 43–17	3–2	Bynum Gymnasium; Chapel Hill, North Carolina
February 12, 1912*	at Durham Y.M.C.A.	L 18–26	3–3	Durham, North Carolina
February 16, 1912*	Virginia Agricultural and Mechanical College and Polytechnic Institute	L 28–37	3–4	Bynum Gymnasium; Chapel Hill, North Carolina
February 19, 1912*	Durham Y.M.C.A.	L 28–29	3–5	Bynum Gymnasium; Chapel Hill, North Carolina
February 26, 1912*	vs. Wake Forest	W 18–15	4–5	Raleigh, North Carolina
*Non-conference game. ^{#}Rankings from AP Poll. (#) Tournament seedings in parentheses. All times are in Eastern Time.

== Regular season ==
On January 5, Durham's Y.M.C.A. team traveled to Chapel Hill, North Carolina to face the Tar Heel in their season–opening match. The Y.M.C.A. brought a strengthened team that featured a couple players who were members of Trinity College's team the prior year. These additions were thought to have made the team better and quicker. North Carolina remained in front for much of the game; however, in the closing minutes, the Y.M.C.A. rallied to take the lead and won 29–18. One writer commented that the Tar Heels missed Ritch's presence. Chapel Hill's Bynum Gymnasium hosted Elon College four days later, where the Tar Heels beat them 36–5 with a strong performance from captain Junius Smith. The Tar Heels were thought to have played fast and showed improved teamwork relative to their opening game. The Tar Heels faced William & Mary on January 12. The first half featured back-and-forth scoring and visiting team led the Tar Heels 19–15 at the half. William & Mary's Metcalf scored several points from foul shots. Carolina held William & Mary to just three points for the whole second half, while the Tar Heels scored 15 more points to seal the victory. Smith again was said to have played the best for the Heels, while Tillett and Hanes were also thought to have played well. Following the game there was a break in the schedule due to the school's exam schedule from January 15 to 25. The Tar Heel reflected on the team's performance by stating they did not have great teamwork or a star player, but just needed practice and could develop into a fast and "good, fighting quint."

Guilford College defeated the Tar Heels 35–20 on January 31. The Guilford players were reportedly heavier than the Carolina starting five, and although the Tar Heels played good defense, their overall teamwork was lacking, and they could not withstand Guilford's "machine-like force". The game had "a great many fouls", and Guilford's Hoyos took seven foul shots while North Carolina's Smith took eight. Virginia Christian arrived in Chapel Hill for the Tar Heels' next game on February 2. The contest was closely fought for the first half as it closed with a Tar Heel advantage of 3 points, 18–15. The second half was dominated by North Carolina as they scored 25 points to Virginia Christian's 2, bringing the final score to 45–17 in Carolina's favor.

The team traveled to Durham for a rematch against their Y.M.C.A. team on February 12. The Y.M.C.A. made more field goals while the Tar Heels made more foul shots, which resulted in a 26–18 victory for Durham. Durham's Holcomb led all scoring and made some long range shots. V.P.I. arrived in Chapel Hill four days later for the next game. The teams played a close game in the first half, where both managed to counter the opposing team's scores frequently. The Tar Heels were led by strong performances from Tillett and Carrington, who helped create a halftime lead of 21–17. As Carolina held the lead early in the second half, Tillett was removed from the game. Tillett's defense proved to be a critical reason for Carolina's success and shortly after his removal, V.P.I. gained the lead. They extended their lead and won 37–28, anchored by the Legge brothers who each scored five apiece. The Tar Heel regarded the game as the "best played and hardest fought game" at Bynum all season long. On February 19, a third match against the Durham Y.M.C.A. happened and proved to be close throughout. Carolina led going into halftime 17–16, but the Durham squad managed to gain the lead and win the game 29–28.

On February 26, Wake Forest and North Carolina faced off in Raleigh, North Carolina. A crowd of nearly 1,000 filled the auditorium to see the contest. The game featured several fouls on both teams (5 on Carolina and 11 on Wake Forest) and inconsistent performances by both teams. Carolina won the first half of the game 10–6 with multiple baskets from Smith. The Tar Heels continued to score and reached 18 points; however, Wake Forest began to click on offense and scored seven shots in the final ten minutes, sinking one as time expired. Their efforts fell short as the game ended 18–15 in Carolina's favor.

== Aftermath ==
Following the game against V.P.I., where an estimated 2,000 people attended, the Alumni Review wrote that "... basketball has come into its own in this state." When the season ended, The Tar Heel published a column where it discussed the basketball championship of North Carolina. The editors spoke of the parity between the North Carolina–based squads and felt that all of them had an equal right to the championship. In September 1912, The Tar Heel published a column where it commented on the season, blaming the poor performance on the fact the team started practice after Christmas, while most other successful teams started in October.
