= 1911–12 Bucknell Bison men's basketball team =

American college basketball season

1911–12 Bucknell Bison men's basketball
- Conference: Independent
- Record: 10–6
- Head coach: C. Fulmer (1st season)
- Captain: Herman Zehner
- Home arena: none

1911–12 NCAA men's basketball independents standings
	Conf.				Overall
Team	W		L	PCT	W		L	PCT
Baylor		–		–	13	–	0	1.000
Brigham Young		–		–	7	–	0	1.000
California		–		–	2	–	0	1.000
Clemson		–		–	4	–	0	1.000
Dayton		–		–	13	–	0	1.000
Grove City		–		–	12	–	0	1.000
Kentucky		–		–	9	–	0	1.000
Mississippi A&M		–		–	9	–	0	1.000
Wesleyan (Conn.)		–		–	13	–	0	1.000
Allegheny		–		–	11	–	1	.917
Swarthmore		–		–	11	–	1	.917
Navy		–		–	8	–	1	.889
Notre Dame		–		–	16	–	2	.889
North Dakota		–		–	13	–	2	.867
Trinity (N.C.)		–		–	6	–	1	.857
Georgia		–		–	6	–	1	.857
Oregon		–		–	12	–	2	.857
Springfield (Mass.)		–		–	6	–	1	.857
Lake Forest		–		–	11	–	2	.846
Oregon Agricultural		–		–	16	–	3	.842
Ole Miss		–		–	10	–	2	.833
Texas		–		–	8	–	1	.889
CCNY		–		–	9	–	2	.818
Nebraska Wesleyan		–		–	9	–	2	.818
Arizona State–Tempe		–		–	8	–	2	.800
Michigan State		–		–	12	–	3	.800
St. Lawrence		–		–	12	–	3	.800
Creighton		–		–	15	–	4	.789
North Central		–		–	11	–	3	.786
Syracuse		–		–	11	–	3	.786
Oklahoma		–		–	7	–	2	.778
Beloit		–		–	6	–	2	.750
Montana State		–		–	6	–	2	.750
Oberlin		–		–	9	–	3	.750
Santa Clara		–		–	18	–	6	.750
St. John's (N.Y.)		–		–	15	–	5	.750
Washington		–		–	12	–	4	.750
Loyola (Md.)		–		–	11	–	4	.733
North Dakota Agricultural		–		–	8	–	3	.727
Wooster		–		–	8	–	3	.727
Canisius		–		–	10	–	4	.714
Franklin		–		–	10	–	4	.714
Lehigh		–		–	10	–	4	.714
Roanoke		–		–	5	–	2	.714
Utah		–		–	5	–	2	.714
Kalamazoo		–		–	7	–	3	.700
Washburn		–		–	11	–	5	.688
Akron		–		–	6	–	3	.667
Army		–		–	8	–	4	.667
Connecticut		–		–	6	–	3	.667
Davidson		–		–	4	–	2	.667
Kansas State		–		–	10	–	5	.667
Manhattan		–		–	12	–	6	.667
Millikin		–		–	10	–	5	.667
Virginia Tech		–		–	6	–	3	.667
Bradley		–		–	11	–	6	.647
Georgetown		–		–	11	–	6	.647
Southern California		–		–	9	–	5	.643
Carleton		–		–	7	–	4	.636
Virginia		–		–	7	–	4	.636
Bucknell		–		–	10	–	6	.625
Penn State		–		–	8	–	5	.615
Union (N.Y.)		–		–	8	–	5	.615
Washington and Lee		–		–	8	–	5	.615
Seton Hall		–		–	9	–	6	.600
Wake Forest		–		–	9	–	6	.600
Hope		–		–	9	–	6	.600
Rhode Island State		–		–	4	–	3	.571
Fordham		–		–	17	–	13	.567
Gettysburg		–		–	9	–	7	.563
Northern Colorado		–		–	5	–	4	.556
Wabash		–		–	5	–	4	.556
Detroit		–		–	6	–	5	.545
VMI		–		–	6	–	5	.545
Colgate		–		–	7	–	6	.538
Indiana State		–		–	8	–	6	.571
Pittsburgh		–		–	10	–	9	.526
Niagara		–		–	11	–	10	.524
Arizona		–		–	2	–	2	.500
Augustana (Ill.)		–		–	7	–	7	.500
Butler		–		–	5	–	5	.500
Denison		–		–	5	–	5	.500
Saint Mary's (Calif.)		–		–	1	–	1	.500
Temple		–		–	4	–	4	.500
Tennessee		–		–	5	–	5	.500
Vanderbilt		–		–	9	–	9	.500
Brown		–		–	6	–	7	.462
Wyoming		–		–	5	–	6	.455
North Carolina		–		–	4	–	5	.444
Marietta		–		–	6	–	8	.429
South Carolina		–		–	3	–	4	.429
LSU		–		–	4	–	6	.400
Mount Union		–		–	4	–	8	.333
New Mexico		–		–	1	–	2	.333
Southwestern (Kan.)		–		–	5	–	10	.333
Wisconsin–Stevens Point		–		–	2	–	4	.333
Miami (Ohio)		–		–	3	–	7	.300
Washington State		–		–	5	–	12	.294
William & Mary		–		–	2	–	5	.286
Auburn		–		–	2	–	6	.250
Oklahoma A&M		–		–	2	–	6	.250
Utah State		–		–	2	–	6	.250
St. Joseph's		–		–	6	–	22	.214
Fairmount		–		–	2	–	8	.200
Cincinnati		–		–	2	–	9	.182
Ohio		–		–	2	–	9	.182
Delaware		–		–	2	–	10	.167
Montana		–		–	1	–	5	.167
Millsaps		–		–	1	–	8	.111
New York University		–		–	1	–	12	.077
Idaho		–		–	1	–	13	.071
Louisville		–		–	0	–	3	.000

The 1911–12 Bucknell Bison men's basketball team represented Bucknell University during the 1911–12 NCAA men's basketball season. The head coach was C. Fulmer, coaching the Bison in his first season. The Bison's team captain was Herman Zehner.

== Schedule ==
Date time, TV	Opponent	Result	Record	Site city, state
1/12/1912*	Lock Haven	W 56–13	1–0	Lewisburg, PA
1/19/1912*	Susquehanna	W 39–21	2–0	Lewisburg, PA
1/26/1912*	Lebanon Valley	W 46–10	3–0	Lewisburg, PA
2/3/1912*	F&M	W 39–12	4–0	Lewisburg, PA
2/8/1912*	at Swarthmore	L 14–31	4–1	Swarthmore, PA
2/10/1912*	at St. John's	L 18–28	4–2	Lewisburg, PA
2/16/1912*	at State College	L 19–35	4–3	Armory; University Park, PA
2/22/1912*	State College	W 21–14	5–3	Lewisburg, PA
2/23/1912*	at Susquehanna	W 27–23	6–3	Selinsgrove, PA
2/24/1912*	Alumni	W 80–20	7–3	Lewisburg, PA
3/1/1912*	at Albright	L 15–24	7–4	Reading, PA
3/2/1912*	at F&M	W 27–24	8–4	Lancaster, PA
3/7/1912*	at Gettysburg	L 27–40	8–5	Gettysburg, PA
3/8/1912*	at Mt. St. Mary's	L 17–18	8–6	Lewisburg, PA
3/9/1912*	at Georgetown	W 41–32	9–6	Arcade Rink; Washington, D.C.
3/16/1912*	Albright	W 37–19	10–6	Lewisburg, PA
*Non-conference game. (#) Tournament seedings in parentheses.
