= 1911–12 Georgetown Hoyas men's basketball team =

American college basketball season

1911–12 Georgetown Hoyas men's basketball
- Conference: Independent
- Record: 11–6
- Head coach: James Colliflower (1st season)
- Captain: Frank Gibson
- Home arena: Arcade Rink

1911–12 NCAA men's basketball independents standings
	Conf.				Overall
Team	W		L	PCT	W		L	PCT
Baylor		–		–	13	–	0	1.000
Brigham Young		–		–	7	–	0	1.000
California		–		–	2	–	0	1.000
Clemson		–		–	4	–	0	1.000
Dayton		–		–	13	–	0	1.000
Grove City		–		–	12	–	0	1.000
Kentucky		–		–	9	–	0	1.000
Mississippi A&M		–		–	9	–	0	1.000
Wesleyan (Conn.)		–		–	13	–	0	1.000
Allegheny		–		–	11	–	1	.917
Swarthmore		–		–	11	–	1	.917
Navy		–		–	8	–	1	.889
Notre Dame		–		–	16	–	2	.889
North Dakota		–		–	13	–	2	.867
Trinity (N.C.)		–		–	6	–	1	.857
Georgia		–		–	6	–	1	.857
Oregon		–		–	12	–	2	.857
Springfield (Mass.)		–		–	6	–	1	.857
Lake Forest		–		–	11	–	2	.846
Oregon Agricultural		–		–	16	–	3	.842
Ole Miss		–		–	10	–	2	.833
Texas		–		–	8	–	1	.889
CCNY		–		–	9	–	2	.818
Nebraska Wesleyan		–		–	9	–	2	.818
Arizona State–Tempe		–		–	8	–	2	.800
Michigan State		–		–	12	–	3	.800
St. Lawrence		–		–	12	–	3	.800
Creighton		–		–	15	–	4	.789
North Central		–		–	11	–	3	.786
Syracuse		–		–	11	–	3	.786
Oklahoma		–		–	7	–	2	.778
Beloit		–		–	6	–	2	.750
Montana State		–		–	6	–	2	.750
Oberlin		–		–	9	–	3	.750
Santa Clara		–		–	18	–	6	.750
St. John's (N.Y.)		–		–	15	–	5	.750
Washington		–		–	12	–	4	.750
Loyola (Md.)		–		–	11	–	4	.733
North Dakota Agricultural		–		–	8	–	3	.727
Wooster		–		–	8	–	3	.727
Canisius		–		–	10	–	4	.714
Franklin		–		–	10	–	4	.714
Lehigh		–		–	10	–	4	.714
Roanoke		–		–	5	–	2	.714
Utah		–		–	5	–	2	.714
Kalamazoo		–		–	7	–	3	.700
Washburn		–		–	11	–	5	.688
Akron		–		–	6	–	3	.667
Army		–		–	8	–	4	.667
Connecticut		–		–	6	–	3	.667
Davidson		–		–	4	–	2	.667
Kansas State		–		–	10	–	5	.667
Manhattan		–		–	12	–	6	.667
Millikin		–		–	10	–	5	.667
Virginia Tech		–		–	6	–	3	.667
Bradley		–		–	11	–	6	.647
Georgetown		–		–	11	–	6	.647
Southern California		–		–	9	–	5	.643
Carleton		–		–	7	–	4	.636
Virginia		–		–	7	–	4	.636
Bucknell		–		–	10	–	6	.625
Penn State		–		–	8	–	5	.615
Union (N.Y.)		–		–	8	–	5	.615
Washington and Lee		–		–	8	–	5	.615
Seton Hall		–		–	9	–	6	.600
Wake Forest		–		–	9	–	6	.600
Hope		–		–	9	–	6	.600
Rhode Island State		–		–	4	–	3	.571
Fordham		–		–	17	–	13	.567
Gettysburg		–		–	9	–	7	.563
Northern Colorado		–		–	5	–	4	.556
Wabash		–		–	5	–	4	.556
Detroit		–		–	6	–	5	.545
VMI		–		–	6	–	5	.545
Colgate		–		–	7	–	6	.538
Indiana State		–		–	8	–	6	.571
Pittsburgh		–		–	10	–	9	.526
Niagara		–		–	11	–	10	.524
Arizona		–		–	2	–	2	.500
Augustana (Ill.)		–		–	7	–	7	.500
Butler		–		–	5	–	5	.500
Denison		–		–	5	–	5	.500
Saint Mary's (Calif.)		–		–	1	–	1	.500
Temple		–		–	4	–	4	.500
Tennessee		–		–	5	–	5	.500
Vanderbilt		–		–	9	–	9	.500
Brown		–		–	6	–	7	.462
Wyoming		–		–	5	–	6	.455
North Carolina		–		–	4	–	5	.444
Marietta		–		–	6	–	8	.429
South Carolina		–		–	3	–	4	.429
LSU		–		–	4	–	6	.400
Mount Union		–		–	4	–	8	.333
New Mexico		–		–	1	–	2	.333
Southwestern (Kan.)		–		–	5	–	10	.333
Wisconsin–Stevens Point		–		–	2	–	4	.333
Miami (Ohio)		–		–	3	–	7	.300
Washington State		–		–	5	–	12	.294
William & Mary		–		–	2	–	5	.286
Auburn		–		–	2	–	6	.250
Oklahoma A&M		–		–	2	–	6	.250
Utah State		–		–	2	–	6	.250
St. Joseph's		–		–	6	–	22	.214
Fairmount		–		–	2	–	8	.200
Cincinnati		–		–	2	–	9	.182
Ohio		–		–	2	–	9	.182
Delaware		–		–	2	–	10	.167
Montana		–		–	1	–	5	.167
Millsaps		–		–	1	–	8	.111
New York University		–		–	1	–	12	.077
Idaho		–		–	1	–	13	.071
Louisville		–		–	0	–	3	.000

The 1911–12 Georgetown Hoyas men's basketball team represented Georgetown University during the 1911–12 NCAA college basketball season. James Colliflower coached the team in his first season as head coach. Georgetown was an independent and – except for two early games at Ryan Gymnasium on the Georgetown campus – played its home games at the Arcade Rink, also known as the Arcadia and as the Arcade Auditorium, in Washington, D.C. It finished the season with a record of 11–6.

A forward and letterman for Georgetown for three seasons while attending Georgetown University Law School, new head coach Colliflower would coach the Hoyas for three seasons, shepherding the team through disputes over it between the undergraduate campus and the Law School. He would compile an overall record of 32–17 before retiring after the 1913–14 season to concentrate on his coal delivery business and to make way for Georgetown's first full-time head coach, John O'Reilly. After O'Reilly fell ill and was unable to coach during the 1921–22 season, however, Colliflower would return for one last season as head coach – without pay – and improve his overall record to 43–20 before leaving coaching for good.

== Season recap ==
Senior forward-center Frank Schlosser led the team in scoring for the fourth straight year, the first man to do so and one of only three men to do so in the first 100 years of Georgetown basketball history. He played in 15 games and scored 159 points averaging 10.1 points per game, half the team's average of 20.2 per game. He finished his collegiate career with 601 points and an average of 10.4 points per game, one of only three men to average in double figures over his career at Georgetown between the 1906–07 and 1942–43 seasons, the "Vintage Era" of Georgetown men's basketball.

Sophomore forward Ronayne "Roy" Waldron was a walk-on who had been called up to the varsity the previous season to play in seven games as a reserve, otherwise playing on the Collegians, an undergraduate team (in an era when the varsity program centered around Georgetown University Law School students) that played against local teams in the Washington, D.C., area. This season, still with the Collegians, he was called up to the varsity again and played in nine games, starting seven of them. He scored a total of 40 points for the season, averaging 4.4 points per game, but he scored a career-high 17 points in a game against Virginia. That performance made him a letterman and, after Schlosser graduated, he would become the team's leading scorer for the next two seasons and one of the top offensive producers of the early years of Georgetown basketball.

== Roster ==
Georgetown players did not wear numbers on their jerseys this season. The first numbered jerseys in Georgetown men's basketball history would not appear until the 1933–34 season.

Name	Height	Weight (lbs.)	Position	Class	Hometown	Previous team(s)
John Bariscillo	N/A	N/A	F	Jr.	Asbury Park, New Jersey, and Washington, D.C., U.S.	Georgetown Preparatory School (North Bethesda, Maryland)
George Colliflower	N/A	N/A	F	Grad. Stud.	Washington, D.C., U.S.	Georgetown Preparatory School (North Bethesda, Maryland)
Hugh Doherty	N/A	N/A	F	So.	N/A	N/A
Sam Foley	N/A	N/A	G	Fr.	N/A	N/A
James "Tug" Fury	N/A	N/A	G	So.	Trenton, New Jersey, U.S.	N/A
Frank Gibson	N/A	N/A	G	Sr.	Holyoke, Massachusetts, U.S.	University of Notre Dame
Lemoyne Graham	N/A	N/A	F	Jr.	N/A	N/A
Ed Heiskell	N/A	N/A	G	So.	Washington, D.C., U.S.	N/A
Bill Hollander	N/A	N/A	C	So.	N/A	N/A
Ed McCarthy	N/A	N/A	F	So.	N/A	N/A
Frank Schlosser	N/A	N/A	C	Sr.	Washington, D.C., U.S.	United States Army
Johnny Shugrue	N/A	N/A	F	Fr.	Washington, D.C., U.S.	Georgetown Preparatory School (North Bethesda, Maryland)
Ronayne "Roy" Waldron	N/A	N/A	F	So.	Greensboro, Pennsylvania, U.S.	N/A
Gene Whalen	N/A	N/A	F	Fr.	N/A	N/A

== 1911–12 schedule and results ==
It was common practice at this time for colleges and universities to include non-collegiate opponents in their schedules, with the games recognized as part of their official record for the season, and the December 11, 1911, game against Baltimore Medical College counted as part of Georgetown's won-loss record for 1911–12. It was not until 1952, after the completion of the 1951–52 season, that the National Collegiate Athletic Association (NCAA) ruled that colleges and universities could no longer count games played against non-collegiate opponents in their annual won-loss records.

Date time, TV	Opponent	Result	Record	Site city, state
Regular season
Mon., Dec. 11, 1911 no, no	Baltimore Medical	W 28–12	1–0	Ryan Gymnasium; Washington, D.C.
Sat., Dec. 16, 1911 no, no	St. John's (Md.)	cancelled		N/A; Washington, D.C.
Sat., Dec. 16, 1911 no, no	All-Collegians	L 28–31 ^{OT}	exhibition	Ryan Gymnasium; Washington, D.C.
Sat., Jan. 6, 1912 no, no	Maryland	W 30–13	2–0	Arcade Rink; Washington, D.C.
Wed., Jan. 10, 1912 no, no	Loyola Maryland	W 20–18 ^{OT}	3–0	Arcade Rink; Washington, D.C.
Mon., Jan. 15, 1912 no, no	St. John's (N.Y.)	L 17–34	3–1	Arcade Rink; Washington, D.C.
Fri., Jan. 19, 1912 no, no	at New York University	L 6–15	3–2	N/A; New York, New York
N/A no, no	at Army	L 13–28	3–3	N/A; West Point, New York
Sat., Jan. 27, 1912 no, no	Virginia	W 35–16	4–3	Arcade Rink; Washington, D.C.
Wed., Jan. 31, 1912 no, no	Catholic	W 27–19	5–3	Arcade Rink; Washington, D.C.
Fri., Feb. 2, 1912 no, no	Dickinson	W 29–27	6–3	Arcade Rink; Washington, D.C.
Mon., Feb. 12, 1912 no, no	at Virginia	L 12–34	6–4	Fayerweather Gymnasium; Charlottesville, Virginia
Wed., Feb. 14, 1912 no, no	New York University	W 22–9	7–4	Arcade Rink; Washington, D.C.
Thu., Feb. 22, 1912 (Note: The Georgetown Basketball History Project: 1910s Records and The Georgetown Basketball History Project: Records vs. All Opponents Archived 2013-11-03 at the Wayback Machine both list February 22, 1912, as the date of both the Navy and Franklin & Marshall games.) no, no	at Navy	L 20–40	7–5	Dahlgren Hall; Annapolis, Maryland
Thu., Feb. 22, 1912 no, no	Franklin & Marshall	W 33–31	8–5	Arcade Rink; Washington, D.C.
Fri., Feb. 23, 1912 no, no	Washington and Lee	W 28–12	9–5	Arcade Rink; Washington, D.C.
Fri., Mar. 1, 1912 no, no	Virginia	W 21–16	10–5	Arcade Rink; Washington, D.C.
Wed., Mar. 6, 1912 no, no	Pittsburgh	W 29–25	11–5	Arcade Rink; Washington, D.C.
Sat., Mar. 9, 1912 no, no	Bucknell	L 33–41	11–6	Arcade Rink; Washington, D.C.
*Non-conference game. (#) Tournament seedings in parentheses.
