= 1911–12 William & Mary Indians men's basketball team =

American college basketball season

1911–12 William & Mary Indians men's basketball
- Conference: Independent
- Record: 2–5
- Head coach: William J. Young (1st season)

1911–12 NCAA men's basketball independents standings
	Conf.				Overall
Team	W		L	PCT	W		L	PCT
Baylor		–		–	13	–	0	1.000
Brigham Young		–		–	7	–	0	1.000
California		–		–	2	–	0	1.000
Clemson		–		–	4	–	0	1.000
Dayton		–		–	13	–	0	1.000
Grove City		–		–	12	–	0	1.000
Kentucky		–		–	9	–	0	1.000
Mississippi A&M		–		–	9	–	0	1.000
Wesleyan (Conn.)		–		–	13	–	0	1.000
Allegheny		–		–	11	–	1	.917
Swarthmore		–		–	11	–	1	.917
Navy		–		–	8	–	1	.889
Notre Dame		–		–	16	–	2	.889
North Dakota		–		–	13	–	2	.867
Trinity (N.C.)		–		–	6	–	1	.857
Georgia		–		–	6	–	1	.857
Oregon		–		–	12	–	2	.857
Springfield (Mass.)		–		–	6	–	1	.857
Lake Forest		–		–	11	–	2	.846
Oregon Agricultural		–		–	16	–	3	.842
Ole Miss		–		–	10	–	2	.833
Texas		–		–	8	–	1	.889
CCNY		–		–	9	–	2	.818
Nebraska Wesleyan		–		–	9	–	2	.818
Arizona State–Tempe		–		–	8	–	2	.800
Michigan State		–		–	12	–	3	.800
St. Lawrence		–		–	12	–	3	.800
Creighton		–		–	15	–	4	.789
North Central		–		–	11	–	3	.786
Syracuse		–		–	11	–	3	.786
Oklahoma		–		–	7	–	2	.778
Beloit		–		–	6	–	2	.750
Montana State		–		–	6	–	2	.750
Oberlin		–		–	9	–	3	.750
Santa Clara		–		–	18	–	6	.750
St. John's (N.Y.)		–		–	15	–	5	.750
Washington		–		–	12	–	4	.750
Loyola (Md.)		–		–	11	–	4	.733
North Dakota Agricultural		–		–	8	–	3	.727
Wooster		–		–	8	–	3	.727
Canisius		–		–	10	–	4	.714
Franklin		–		–	10	–	4	.714
Lehigh		–		–	10	–	4	.714
Roanoke		–		–	5	–	2	.714
Utah		–		–	5	–	2	.714
Kalamazoo		–		–	7	–	3	.700
Washburn		–		–	11	–	5	.688
Akron		–		–	6	–	3	.667
Army		–		–	8	–	4	.667
Connecticut		–		–	6	–	3	.667
Davidson		–		–	4	–	2	.667
Kansas State		–		–	10	–	5	.667
Manhattan		–		–	12	–	6	.667
Millikin		–		–	10	–	5	.667
Virginia Tech		–		–	6	–	3	.667
Bradley		–		–	11	–	6	.647
Georgetown		–		–	11	–	6	.647
Southern California		–		–	9	–	5	.643
Carleton		–		–	7	–	4	.636
Virginia		–		–	7	–	4	.636
Bucknell		–		–	10	–	6	.625
Penn State		–		–	8	–	5	.615
Union (N.Y.)		–		–	8	–	5	.615
Washington and Lee		–		–	8	–	5	.615
Seton Hall		–		–	9	–	6	.600
Wake Forest		–		–	9	–	6	.600
Hope		–		–	9	–	6	.600
Rhode Island State		–		–	4	–	3	.571
Fordham		–		–	17	–	13	.567
Gettysburg		–		–	9	–	7	.563
Northern Colorado		–		–	5	–	4	.556
Wabash		–		–	5	–	4	.556
Detroit		–		–	6	–	5	.545
VMI		–		–	6	–	5	.545
Colgate		–		–	7	–	6	.538
Indiana State		–		–	8	–	6	.571
Pittsburgh		–		–	10	–	9	.526
Niagara		–		–	11	–	10	.524
Arizona		–		–	2	–	2	.500
Augustana (Ill.)		–		–	7	–	7	.500
Butler		–		–	5	–	5	.500
Denison		–		–	5	–	5	.500
Saint Mary's (Calif.)		–		–	1	–	1	.500
Temple		–		–	4	–	4	.500
Tennessee		–		–	5	–	5	.500
Vanderbilt		–		–	9	–	9	.500
Brown		–		–	6	–	7	.462
Wyoming		–		–	5	–	6	.455
North Carolina		–		–	4	–	5	.444
Marietta		–		–	6	–	8	.429
South Carolina		–		–	3	–	4	.429
LSU		–		–	4	–	6	.400
Mount Union		–		–	4	–	8	.333
New Mexico		–		–	1	–	2	.333
Southwestern (Kan.)		–		–	5	–	10	.333
Wisconsin–Stevens Point		–		–	2	–	4	.333
Miami (Ohio)		–		–	3	–	7	.300
Washington State		–		–	5	–	12	.294
William & Mary		–		–	2	–	5	.286
Auburn		–		–	2	–	6	.250
Oklahoma A&M		–		–	2	–	6	.250
Utah State		–		–	2	–	6	.250
St. Joseph's		–		–	6	–	22	.214
Fairmount		–		–	2	–	8	.200
Cincinnati		–		–	2	–	9	.182
Ohio		–		–	2	–	9	.182
Delaware		–		–	2	–	10	.167
Montana		–		–	1	–	5	.167
Millsaps		–		–	1	–	8	.111
New York University		–		–	1	–	12	.077
Idaho		–		–	1	–	13	.071
Louisville		–		–	0	–	3	.000

The 1911–12 William & Mary Indians men's basketball team represented the College of William & Mary in intercollegiate basketball during the 1911–12 season. The team finished the season with a 2–5 record. This was the seventh season in program history for William & Mary, whose nickname is now "Tribe."

== Schedule ==
Date time, TV	Rank^{#}	Opponent^{#}	Result	Record	Site city, state
Regular season
1/11/1912*		Duke	L 16–53	0–1	Williamsburg, VA
1/12/1912*		at North Carolina	L 22–30 (Note: The score for the North Carolina game has been reported to be 30–22, while one source indicates it was 35–21.)	0–2	Bynum Gymnasium; Chapel Hill, NC
*		Wake Forest	L 4–31	0–3	Williamsburg, VA
*		Fredericksburg Athletic Club	W 50–5	1–3	Williamsburg, VA
*		Medical College of Virginia	W 41–2	2–3	Williamsburg, VA
*		Randolph–Macon	L 13–26	2–4	Williamsburg, VA
*		Randolph–Macon	L 11–42	2–5	Williamsburg, VA
*Non-conference game. ^{#}Rankings from AP Poll. (#) Tournament seedings in parentheses.

== Sources ==
- Kirschner, Steve, ed. (2018). Carolina Basketball 2018-19 Facts & Records Book (PDF). Chapel Hill, North Carolina: UNC Athletic Communications Office. Archived (PDF) from the original on October 27, 2019.
- Sears, Kris, ed. (2019). William & Mary Men's Basketball Record Book (PDF). William & Mary Media Relations. Archived (PDF) from the original on October 30, 2019.
