= 1911–12 University of Virginia men's basketball team =

American college basketball season

1911–12 University of Virginia men's basketball
- Conference: South Atlantic Intercollegiate Athletic Association
- Record: 7–4 (2–3 SAIAA)
- Head coach: Henry Lannigan (7th season)
- Home arena: Fayerweather Gymnasium

The 1911–12 University of Virginia men's basketball team represented the University of Virginia during the 1911–12 NCAA men's basketball season. The team was led by seventh-year head coach Henry Lannigan, and played their home games at Fayerweather Gymnasium in Charlottesville, Virginia. Now known as the Virginia Cavaliers, the team did not have an official nickname prior to 1923.

== Schedule ==
Date time, TV	Opponent	Result	Record	Site city, state
Regular season
January 8* no, no	Emory and Henry	W 20–18	1–0	Fayerweather Gymnasium; Charlottesville, VA
January 13* no, no	Washington & Lee	W 20–10	2–0	Fayerweather Gymnasium; Charlottesville, VA
January 22* no, no	Gallaudet	L 15–16	2–1	Fayerweather Gymnasium; Charlottesville, VA
January 26* no, no	at Catholic	W 34–18	3–1	Washington, DC
January 27 no, no	at Georgetown	L 16–34	3–2 (0–1)	Arcade Rink; Washington, DC
February 2 no, no	at Washington & Lee	L 9–24	3–3 (0–2)	Lexington, VA
February 3* no, no	at VMI	W 17–16	4–3 (0–2)	Lexington, VA
February 12 no, no	Georgetown	W 35–12	5–3 (1–2)	Fayerweather Gymnasium; Charlottesville, VA
February 16 no, no	Washington & Lee	W 23–13	6–3 (2–2)	Fayerweather Gymnasium; Charlottesville, VA
February 23* no, no	Franklin & Marshall	W 39–27	7–3 (2–2)	Fayerweather Gymnasium; Charlottesville, VA
March 1 no, no	at Georgetown	L 16–21	7–4 (2–3)	Arcade Rink; Washington, DC
*Non-conference game. (#) Tournament seedings in parentheses. All times are in Eastern Time.
