= 1911–12 NC State Wolfpack men's basketball team =

American college basketball season

1911–12 NC State Wolfpack men's basketball
- Conference: Independent
- Record: 0–6
- Head coach: Piggy Hargrove (2nd season)
- Captain: Piggy Hargrove

The 1911–12 NC State Wolfpack men's basketball team represented North Carolina State University during the 1911–12 college men's basketball season. The Head coach was Piggy Hargrove coaching the team in his second season.

== Schedule ==
Date time, TV	Opponent	Result	Record	Site city, state
*	Wake Forest	L 14–23	0–1	Raleigh, NC
*	Guilford	L 21–24	0–2	Raleigh, NC
February 9*	Duke	L 27–30	0–3	Raleigh, NC
*	Guilford	L 9–40	0–4	Raleigh, NC
*	Wake Forest	L 9–50	0–5	Raleigh, NC
*	Wake Forest	L 9–28	0–6	Raleigh, NC
*Non-conference game. (#) Tournament seedings in parentheses.
