= 1911–12 Iowa State Cyclones men's basketball team =

American college basketball season

1911–12 Iowa State Cyclones men's basketball
- Conference: Missouri Valley Intercollegiate Athletic Association
- Record: 8–7 (4–4 MVIAA)
- Head coach: Homer Hubbard (1st season)
- Assistant coach: Clyde Williams
- Home arena: Margaret Hall Gymnasium

1911–12 Missouri Valley Intercollegiate Athletic Association men's basketball standings
	Conf.				Overall
Team	W		L	PCT	W		L	PCT
North Division
Nebraska†	8	–	0	1.000	14	–	1	.933
Iowa State	4	–	4	.500	8	–	7	.533
Drake	0	–	8	.000	2	–	11	.154
South Division
Kansas†	6	–	2	.750	11	–	7	.611
Washington University	5	–	3	.625	8	–	5	.615
Missouri	1	–	7	.125	5	–	10	.333
† Conference co-championship winner

The 1911–12 Iowa State Cyclones men's basketball team (also known informally as Ames) represented Iowa State University during the 1911–12 NCAA men's basketball season. The Cyclones were coached by Homer Hubbard, who was in his first season with the Cyclones. This was the final season for the Cyclones at the Margaret Hall Gymnasium in Ames, Iowa.

They finished the season 8–7, 4–4 in Missouri Valley play to finish in second place in the North division.

== Roster ==
1911–12 Iowa State Cyclones men's basketball team
Players
Coaches

Pos.	#	Name	Height	Weight	Year	Hometown
F		Earl Bisbee	—	—		Oak Park, Illinois
G		Allie Chappel (C)	—	—		West Des Moines, Iowa
		L.E. Corray	—	—
F		H.K. Dalby	—	—		Cedar Rapids, Iowa
G/F		Austin Dowell	—	—		Bedford, Iowa
F		Gates Harpel	—	—		Boone, Iowa
G/F		Charles King	—	—		Keokuk, Iowa
F		F.D. Millar	—	—		Muscatine, Iowa
C		Hans Pfund	—	—		Des Moines, Iowa

Head coach

- Homer Hubbard

Assistant coach(es)

- Clyde Williams

Legend

- (C) Team captain
- (S) Suspended
- (I) Ineligible
- (W) Walk-on
- Injured
- Current redshirt

== Schedule and results ==
Date time, TV	Rank^{#}	Opponent^{#}	Result	Record	Site city, state
Regular season
January 17, 1912*		at Missouri	L 24–25 ^{OT}	0–1	Rothwell Gymnasium; Columbia, Missouri
January 18, 1912*		at Missouri	L 10–18	0–2	Rothwell Gymnasium; Columbia, Missouri
January 19, 1912		at Drake; Iowa Big Four	W 23–11	1–2 (1–0)	Alumni Gymnasium; Des Moines, Iowa
January 26, 1912*		at Grinnell	L 15–25	1–3	Grinnell, Iowa
January 30, 1912		Drake; Iowa Big Four	W 36–23	2–3 (2–0)	Margaret Hall Gymnasium; Ames, Iowa
January 31, 1912*		Grinnell	W 27–17	3–3	Margaret Hall Gymnasium; Ames, Iowa
February 2, 1912		at Nebraska	L 12–33	3–4 (2–1)	Grant Memorial Hall; Lincoln, Nebraska
February 3, 1912		at Nebraska	L 14–40	3–5 (2–2)	Grant Memorial Hall; Lincoln, Nebraska
February 6, 1912		at Drake; Iowa Big Four	W 23–17	4–5 (3–2)	Alumni Gymnasium; Des Moines, Iowa
February 15, 1912*		Washington (Mo.)	W 34–20	5–5	Margaret Hall Gymnasium; Ames, Iowa
February 16, 1912*		Missouri	W 25–9	6–5	Margaret Hall Gymnasium; Ames, Iowa
February 17, 1912*		Missouri	W 35–13	7–5	Margaret Hall Gymnasium; Ames, Iowa
February 23, 1912		Nebraska	L 21–31	7–6 (3–3)	Margaret Hall Gymnasium; Ames, Iowa
February 24, 1912		Nebraska	L 12–31	7–7 (3–4)	Margaret Hall Gymnasium; Ames, Iowa
February 27, 1912		Drake; Iowa Big Four	W 32–27	8–7 (4–4)	Margaret Hall Gymnasium; Ames, Iowa
*Non-conference game. ^{#}Rankings from AP poll. (#) Tournament seedings in parentheses. All times are in Central Time.
