= Arthur Kiefaber =

American basketball player and coach (1884–1928)

Biographical details
- Born: April 27, 1884; Camden, New Jersey, U.S.
- Died: September 5, 1928 (aged 44); Lakewood Township, New Jersey, U.S.

Playing career
- 1905–1909: Penn

Coaching career (HC unless noted)
- 1909–1910: Penn (freshmen)
- 1912–1914: Penn

Head coaching record
- Overall: 10–24 (.294)

Arthur Blaine Kiefaber (April 27, 1884 – September 5, 1928) was an American basketball player and coach for the Penn Quakers men's basketball team.

== Basketball ==
Kiefaber was born in Camden, New Jersey, on April 27, 1884, to Peter and Annie (Reiss) Kiefaber. He played football and basketball at Philadelphia's Central High School. He was a member of the CHS teams that won four consecutive Philadelphia Interscholastic Basketball titles and the 1902 Philadelphia City Basketball Championship. He was team captain during the 1903–04 season. He played for basketball at Penn from 1905 to 1909 and was a member of two Eastern Intercollegiate Basketball League championship teams (1906 and 1908).

Kiefaber graduated from the University of Pennsylvania in 1909, but remained with the Quakers as coach of the freshman basketball team. He was head coach of the varsity team from 1912 to 1914 and compiled a 10–24 record.

== Post-basketball ==
On July 25, 1919, Kiefaber married Estelle Hyers. He worked a real estate and insurance broker in Philadelphia and resided in Merchantville, New Jersey.

== Death ==
In September 1928, Kiefaber showed signs of a ruptured blood vessel after swimming. He was rushed to Paul Kimball Hospital a few days later. On September 15, 1928, he died when a blood clot reached his heart. It was believed that an injury he suffered playing basketball at Penn contributed to his death. In 1929, Kiefaber's former Penn teammates donated a loving cup to the university's council on athletics. The Arthur Kiefaber Award is presented annually to Penn's most valuable player.
