= Joseph Brinn =

American basketball player and coach

Biographical details
- Education: Trinity (1911)

Playing career

Basketball
- 1910–1911: Trinity
- Position: Guard

Coaching career (HC unless noted)

Basketball
- 1912–13: Trinity

Head coaching record
- Overall: 11–8

Joseph E. Brinn was an American basketball player and coach. He played for the Trinity Blue and White (now the Duke Blue Devils) in 1910 and 1911, and then served as the team's head coach in 1912–13.

== Head coaching record ==
Record table
Season	Team	Overall	Conference	Standing	Postseason
Trinity Blue and White (Independent) (1912–1913)
1912–13	Trinity	11–8			
Trinity:		11–8			
Total:		11–8			
National champion Postseason invitational champion Conference regular season champion Conference regular season and conference tournament champion Division regular season champion Division regular season and conference tournament champion Conference tournament champion
