= 1911–12 Mississippi A&M Aggies men's basketball team =

American college basketball season

1911–12 Mississippi A&M Aggies men's basketball

State champion
- Conference: Southern Intercollegiate Athletic Association
- Record: 9–0 (6–0 SIAA)
- Head coach: Earl C. Hayes (1st season)

The 1911–12 Mississippi A&M Bulldogs basketball team represented Mississippi A&M College in the 1911–12 college basketball season.
