= Texas Longhorns men's basketball, 1910–1919 =

American collegiate basketball team results

== 1909–10 season ==
=== Schedule and results ===
Coach: W.E. Metzenthin; Overall record: 6–7
Date	Opponent	Site	Result	Record
?	Deaf and Dumb Institute	Clark Field • Austin, Texas	W 92–14	1–0
?	@ Southwestern	? • Georgetown, Texas	W 35–13	2–0
?	@ St. Edward's	? • Austin, Texas	W 70–14	3–0
Feb 5	Baylor	Clark Field • Austin, Texas	L 28–31	3–1
?	San Antonio YMCA	Clark Field • Austin, Texas	W 31–19	4–1
?	@ Allen Academy	? • Bryan, Texas	L 21–35	4–2
?	@ Allen Academy	? • Bryan, Texas	L 23–24	4–3
?	@ Baylor	? • Waco, Texas	W 40–37	5–3
?	@ Decatur Baptist	? • Decatur, Texas	L 19–28	5–4
?	@ Oklahoma	? • Norman, Oklahoma	L 26–59	5–5
?	@ Oklahoma	? • Norman, Oklahoma	L 23–63	5–6
?	@ Fort Worth Polytechnic	? • Fort Worth, Texas	W 35–29	6–6
?	@ Waco YMCA	? • Waco, Texas	L 28–29	6–7

== 1910–11 season ==
=== Schedule and results ===
Coach: W.E. Metzenthin; Overall record: 1–4
Date	Opponent	Site	Result	Record
Jan 28	@ St. Edward's	? • Austin, Texas	W 61–19	1–0
?	Baylor	Clark Field • Austin, Texas	L 33–34	1–1
?	@ Tulane	New Orleans YMCA Gym • New Orleans, Louisiana	L 19–27	1–2
?	@ Alabama Polytechnic	? • Auburn, Alabama	L 27–45	1–3
?	@ Louisiana State	? • Baton Rouge, Louisiana	L 15–40	1–4

== 1911–12 season ==
=== Schedule and results ===
Coach: J. Burton Rix; Overall record: 5–1
Date	Opponent	Site	Result	Record
Jan 15	St. Edward's	Clark Field • Austin, Texas	W 24–7	1–0
?	22nd Infantry	Clark Field • Austin, Texas	W 39–33	2–0
?	@ San Antonio YMCA	? • San Antonio, Texas	W 32–31	3–0
?	@ San Antonio Turnverein	? • San Antonio, Texas	W 37–35	4–0
?	Baylor	Clark Field • Austin, Texas	L 26–38	4–1
?	San Antonio YMCA	Clark Field • Austin, Texas	W 41–22	5–1

== 1912–13 season ==
=== Schedule and results ===
Coach: Carl C. Taylor; Overall record: 8–4
Date	Opponent	Site	Result	Record
Jan 13	San Marcos Baptist	Ben Hur Temple • Austin, Texas	W 46–2	1–0
?	Southwestern	Ben Hur Temple • Austin, Texas	W 43–11	2–0
?	Baylor	Ben Hur Temple • Austin, Texas	W 41–15	3–0
?	San Antonio YMCA	Ben Hur Temple • Austin, Texas	W 28–31	4–0
?	@ Fort Worth YMCA	? • Fort Worth, Texas	L 24–31	4–1
Feb 6	@ Decatur Baptist	? • Decatur, Texas	L 17–20	4–2
Feb 6	@ Fort Worth Polytechnic	? • Fort Worth, Texas	L 18–23	4–3
Feb 7	@ Waco YMCA	? • Waco, Texas	W 44–23	5–3
Feb 7	@ Baylor	? • Waco, Texas	L 25–33	5–4
?	@ Southwestern	? • Georgetown, Texas	W 70–7	6–4
?	Decatur Baptist	Ben Hur Temple • Austin, Texas	W 57–18	7–4
Feb 26	Waco YMCA	Ben Hur Temple • Austin, Texas	W 47–12	8–4

== 1913–14 season ==
=== Schedule and results ===
Coach: L. Theo Bellmont; Overall record: 11–0
Date	Opponent	Site	Result	Record
?	San Marcos Baptist	Clark Field • Austin, Texas	W 41–11	1–0
?	St. Edward's	Clark Field • Austin, Texas	W 34–18	2–0
?	Decatur Baptist	Clark Field • Austin, Texas	W 25–17	3–0
?	Southwestern	Clark Field • Austin, Texas	W 46–20	4–0
?	Baylor	Clark Field • Austin, Texas	W 51–20	5–0
?	Faculty All-Stars	Clark Field • Austin, Texas	W 25–19	6–0
?	@ Baylor	? • Waco, Texas	W 53–19	7–0
?	@ Fort Worth Polytechnic	? • Fort Worth, Texas	W 34–25	8–0
?	@ North Texas State	? • Denton, Texas	W 34–25	9–0
?	@ Southwestern	? • Georgetown, Texas	W 49–7	10–0
?	North Texas State	Clark Field • Austin, Texas	W 53–22	11–0

== 1914–15 season ==
=== Schedule and results ===
Coach: L. Theo Bellmont; Overall record: 14–0; Southwest Conference record: 5–0; Southwest Conference standing: 1st
Date	Opponent	Site	Result	Record
?	Austin High School	Clark Field • Austin, Texas	W 33–12	1–0
?	St. Edward's	Clark Field • Austin, Texas	W 46–3	2–0
?	San Marcos Baptist	Clark Field • Austin, Texas	W 41–11	3–0
?	Dallas University	Clark Field • Austin, Texas	W 27–9	4–0
?	Decatur Baptist	Clark Field • Austin, Texas	W 28–25	5–0
?	TCU	UT Women's Gym • Austin, Texas	W 53–27	6–0
?	Rice*	UT Women's Gym • Austin, Texas	W 28–14	7–0
Feb 8	Southwestern*	? • Fort Worth, Texas	W 31–21	8–0
?	Baylor*	Clark Field • Austin, Texas	W 52–16	9–0
?	@ North Texas State	? • Denton, Texas	W 64–13	10–0
?	@ Dallas University	? • Dallas, Texas	W 30–13	11–0
?	@ TCU	? • Fort Worth, Texas	W 39–25	12–0
?	@ Baylor*	? • Waco, Texas	W 60–29	13–0
?	@ Baylor*	? • Waco, Texas	W 57–19	14–0
*Southwest Conference Game.

== 1915–16 season ==
=== Schedule and results ===
Coach: Roy Henderson; Overall record: 12–0; Southwest Conference record: 6–0; Southwest Conference standing: 1st
Date	Opponent	Site	Result	Record
Jan 10	San Marcos Baptist	Clark Field • Austin, Texas	W 102–1	1–0
?	St. Edward's	Clark Field • Austin, Texas	W 80–7	2–0
?	Southwestern*	Clark Field • Austin, Texas	W 39–5	3–0
?	@ North Texas State	? • Denton, Texas	W 39–19	4–0
?	@ TCU	? • Fort Worth, Texas	W 51–20	5–0
?	@ Baylor*	? • Waco, Texas	W 44–22	6–0
?	Baylor*	UT Women's Gym • Austin, Texas	W 22–9	7–0
?	Simmons	Clark Field • Austin, Texas	W 41–14	8–0
?	@ Southwestern*	? • Georgetown, Texas	W 52–34	9–0
?	TCU	Clark Field • Austin, Texas	W 40–11	10–0
?	Rice*	Clark Field • Austin, Texas	W 32–27	11–0
?	Rice*	? • Houston, Texas	W 17–16	12–0
*Southwest Conference Game.

== 1916–17 season ==
=== Schedule and results ===
Coach: C.E. Van Gent; Overall record: 13–3; Southwest Conference record: 7–1; Southwest Conference standing: 1st
Date	Opponent	Site	Result	Record
?	Southwest Texas State	UT Women's Gym • Austin, Texas	W 52–15	1–0
Jan 24	Southwestern	UT Men's Gym • Austin, Texas	W 34–14	2–0
Jan 25	Decatur Baptist	UT Men's Gym • Austin, Texas	W 30–26	3–0
?	Rice	UT Men's Gym • Austin, Texas	W 30–18	4–0
?	Rice	UT Men's Gym • Austin, Texas	L 18–24	4–1
?	Baylor*	UT Men's Gym • Austin, Texas	W 27–19	5–1
?	Baylor*	UT Men's Gym • Austin, Texas	W 19–11	6–1
?	@ Rice	? • Houston, Texas	W 26–24 ^{2OT}	7–1
?	@ Rice	? • Houston, Texas	L 14–27	7–2
?	@ Baylor*	? • Waco, Texas	W 32–15	8–2
?	@ Baylor*	? • Waco, Texas	W 31–25	9–2
?	@ Southwestern	? • Georgetown, Texas	W 24–18	10–2
Feb 27	Texas A&M*	UT Men's Gym • Austin, Texas	W 38–16	11–2
Feb 28	Texas A&M*	UT Men's Gym • Austin, Texas	W 24–19	12–2
?	@ Texas A&M*	? • College Station, Texas	L 15–29	12–3
?	@ Texas A&M*	? • College Station, Texas	W 24–16	13–3
*Southwest Conference Game. ^{OT} indicates overtime.

== 1917–18 season ==
=== Schedule and results ===
Coach: Roy Henderson; Overall record: 16–5^{†} Southwest Conference record: 8–4; Southwest Conference standing: 2nd
Date	Opponent	Site	Result	Record
?	San Marcos Baptist	UT Men's Gym • Austin, Texas	W (score unrecorded)	1–0
?	Southwest Texas State	UT Men's Gym • Austin, Texas	W (score unrecorded)	2–0
?	Southwestern	UT Men's Gym • Austin, Texas	W 43–2	3–0
?	Decatur Baptist	UT Men's Gym • Austin, Texas	W 36–22	4–0
Jan 24	@ North Texas State	? • Denton, Texas	L 20–24	4–1
Jan 25	@ TCU	? • Fort Worth, Texas	W 38–23	5–1
Jan 25	@ SMU	? • Dallas, Texas	W 22–21	6–1
Jan 26	@ Baylor*	? • Waco, Texas	L 32–36	6–2
Jan 29	Baylor*	UT Men's Gym • Austin, Texas	W 31–15	7–2
?	@ Rice*	? • Houston, Texas	W 28–16	8–2
?	@ Rice*	? • Houston, Texas	W 32–25	9–2
?	SMU	UT Men's Gym • Austin, Texas	W 35–14	10–2
?	Oklahoma A&M*	UT Men's Gym • Austin, Texas	W 33–9	11–2
?	Oklahoma A&M*	UT Men's Gym • Austin, Texas	W 30–19	12–2
?	TCU	UT Men's Gym • Austin, Texas	W 48–21	13–2
?	Texas A&M*	UT Men's Gym • Austin, Texas	W 27–15	14–2
?	Texas A&M*	UT Men's Gym • Austin, Texas	L 12–21	14–3
Feb 21	@ Texas A&M*	? • College Station, Texas	W 7–8 (A&M forfeited)^{#}	15–3
?	@ Texas A&M*	? • College Station, Texas	W 17–12	16–3
?	Rice*	UT Men's Gym • Austin, Texas	L 36–40	16–4
?	Rice*	UT Men's Gym • Austin, Texas	L 27–31	16–5
^{†}14–5 in official UT records (games with unrecorded scores not counted). *Southwest Conference Game.^{#}A&M later forfeited due to use of ineligible player.

== 1918–19 season ==
=== Schedule and results ===
Coach: Roy Henderson; Overall record: 17–3; Southwest Conference record: 11–2; Southwest Conference standing: 1st
Date	Opponent	Site	Result	Record
?	School of Military Aeronautics	UT Men's Gym • Austin, Texas	W 22–15	1–0
?	Southwestern	UT Men's Gym • Austin, Texas	W 25–12	2–0
?	TCU	UT Men's Gym • Austin, Texas	W 37–17	3–0
?	North Texas State	UT Men's Gym • Austin, Texas	W 52–24	4–0
?	North Texas State	UT Men's Gym • Austin, Texas	L 18–25	4–1
?	@ SMU*	? • Dallas, Texas	W 33–19	5–1
?	@ TCU	? • Fort Worth, Texas	W 40–25	6–1
?	@ Baylor*	? • Waco, Texas	W 21–13	7–1
?	@ Rice*	? • Houston, Texas	W 23–22	8–1
?	@ Rice*	? • Houston, Texas	W 38–22	9–1
Feb 7	SMU*	UT Men's Gym • Austin, Texas	W 29–7	10–1
Feb 8	SMU*	UT Men's Gym • Austin, Texas	W 23–15	11–1
?	Southwest Texas State	UT Men's Gym • Austin, Texas	W 89–6	12–1
?	Rice*	UT Men's Gym • Austin, Texas	W 28–25	13–1
?	Rice*	UT Men's Gym • Austin, Texas	W 36–11	14–1
?	Baylor*	UT Men's Gym • Austin, Texas	W 40–7	15–1
?	@ Texas A&M*	? • College Station, Texas	W 28–19	16–1
?	@ Texas A&M*	? • College Station, Texas	L 15–22	16–2
Feb 28	Texas A&M*	UT Men's Gym • Austin, Texas	L 20–28	16–3
Mar 1	Texas A&M*	UT Men's Gym • Austin, Texas	W 22–15	17–3
*Southwest Conference Game.
