= 1911–12 Ohio Bobcats men's basketball team =

American college basketball season

1911–12 Ohio Bobcats men's basketball
- Conference: Ohio Athletic Conference
- Record: 2–9 (1–4 OAC)
- Head coach: Arthur W. Hinaman (1st season)
- Home arena: Ohio Gymnasium

The 1911–12 Ohio Bobcats men's basketball team represented Ohio University. Arthur W. Hinaman was the head coach for Ohio. The Bobcats played their home games in Ohio Gymnasium.

== Schedule ==
Date time, TV	Rank^{#}	Opponent^{#}	Result	Record	Site (attendance) city, state
Regular Season
*		Marietta	L 18–24	0–1	Ohio Gymnasium; Athens, OH
*		at Muskingum	L 12–31	0–2	New Concord, OH
		at Kenyon	L 36–40	0–3	Gambier, OH
		Wittenberg	W 27–12	1–3	Ohio Gymnasium; Athens, OH
		Ohio Wesleyan	L 27–39	1–4	Ohio Gymnasium; Athens, OH
*		Otterbein	W 24–21	2–4	Ohio Gymnasium; Athens, OH
*		at Hiram	L 25–68	2–5	Hiram, OH
		at Wooster	L 11–34	2–6	Wooster, OH
*		at Marietta	L 32–37	2–7	Marietta, OH
*		Akron	L 18–21	2–8	Ohio Gymnasium; Athens, OH
		Western Reserve	L 21–23	2–9	Ohio Gymnasium; Athens, OH
*Non-conference game. ^{#}Rankings from AP Poll. (#) Tournament seedings in parentheses. All times are in Eastern Time.
