= 1911–12 Auburn Tigers men's basketball team =

American college basketball season

1911–12 Auburn Tigers men's basketball
- Conference: Southern Intercollegiate Athletic Association
- Record: 2–6 (1–1 SIAA)
- Head coach: Mike Donahue (7th season)
- Captain: Earl A. Major
- Home arena: The Gymnasium

The 1911–12 Auburn Tigers men's basketball team represented Auburn University during the 1911–12 college basketball season. The head coach was Mike Donahue, coaching his seventh season with the Tigers.

== Schedule ==
Date time, TV	Opponent	Result	Record	Site city, state
*	Columbus YMCA	L 12–49	0–1	
*	at Atlanta Athletic Club	L 22–60	0–2	
	at Georgia	L 19–40	0–3	Founders Hall; Athens, GA
*	Birmingham Athletic Club	L 26–35	0–4	
*	Birmingham H.S.	W 31–8	1–4	
*	Birmingham Athletic Club	L 9–27	1–5	
*	Bessemer Athletic Club	L 19–20	1–6	
February 10, 1912	LSU	W 38–15	2–6	The Gymnasium; Auburn, AL
*Non-conference game. (#) Tournament seedings in parentheses.
