= North Central Cardinals =

- University: North Central College
- NCAA: Division III
- Conference: College Conference of Illinois and Wisconsin
- Athletic director: Jim Miller
- Location: Naperville, Illinois
- Varsity teams: 24
- Football stadium: Benedetti–Wehrli Stadium
- Basketball arena: Merner Field House
- Baseball stadium: Zimmerman Stadium
- Softball stadium: Shanower Family Field
- Outdoor track and field venue: Al B. Carius Track
- Other venues: Nichols Gymnasium
- Nickname: Cardinals
- Colors: Cardinal and black
- Website: northcentralcardinals.com

Team NCAA championships
- 26

The North Central Cardinals are the athletic teams that represent North Central College, located in Naperville, Illinois, in NCAA Division III intercollegiate sports.

The Cardinals compete as members of the College Conference of Illinois and Wisconsin (CCIW) for all sports except women's triathlon, which is an independent.

== Conference affiliations ==
- Illinois Intercollegiate Athletic Conference (1927–1937)
- College Conference of Illinois and Wisconsin (1946–present)

== Varsity teams ==
Men's sports	Women's sports
Baseball	Basketball
Basketball	Cross country
Cross country	Golf
Football	Lacrosse
Golf	Soccer
Lacrosse	Softball
Soccer	Swimming and diving
Swimming and diving	Tennis
Tennis	Track and field
Track and field	Triathlon
Volleyball	Volleyball
Wrestling	Wrestling

=== Basketball ===
North Central's women's basketball team won the 1983 NCAA Women's Division III Basketball Championship in an 83–71 win over then-defending champions, Elizabethtown College. The men's team reached the Division III Sweet Sixteen in 2012, and the Final Four in 2013.

=== Football ===
North Central's football team has won three NCAA Division III football championships. They earned their first national championship in the 2019 Stagg Bowl with a 41–14 victory against Wisconsin–Whitewater. Following the 2020 COVID-19 season in which no games were played, they finished as the national runner-up in 2021 after a 57–24 defeat in the national championship to Mary Hardin–Baylor. In 2022, they earned their second national championship with a 28–21 victory against Mount Union. In the 2023 Stagg Bowl they finished as the national runner-up, losing in a close game to Cortland, 38–37. North Central claimed their third national championship in the 2025 Stagg Bowl, beating Mount Union 41–25.

=== Track and field ===
The college is best known for its men's track and field and cross country teams, which have won 25 national championships, under the leadership of Coach Al Carius. Carius has been coach since 1966 and was inducted into the U.S. Track & Field and Cross Country Coaches Association Hall of Fame in 2006. For the 2009–2010 school year, the men's cross country and indoor/outdoor track teams swept the NCAA Division III Championships. North Central is only the second school in Division III history to accomplish this feat. During the 2011–2012 school year, the men's indoor track team repeated again as national champions, and the cross country team repeated as national champions. The campus has also hosted past NCAA Division III national events.

=== Wrestling ===
Yelena Makoyed was awarded the 2023 Anthony-Maroulis Trophy for her successes in women's wrestling.

Bella Mir captured the inaugural NCAA Women's Wrestling Championship at 145 lbs. in March 2026, defeating Reese Larramendy of Iowa in the finals.

== Facilities ==
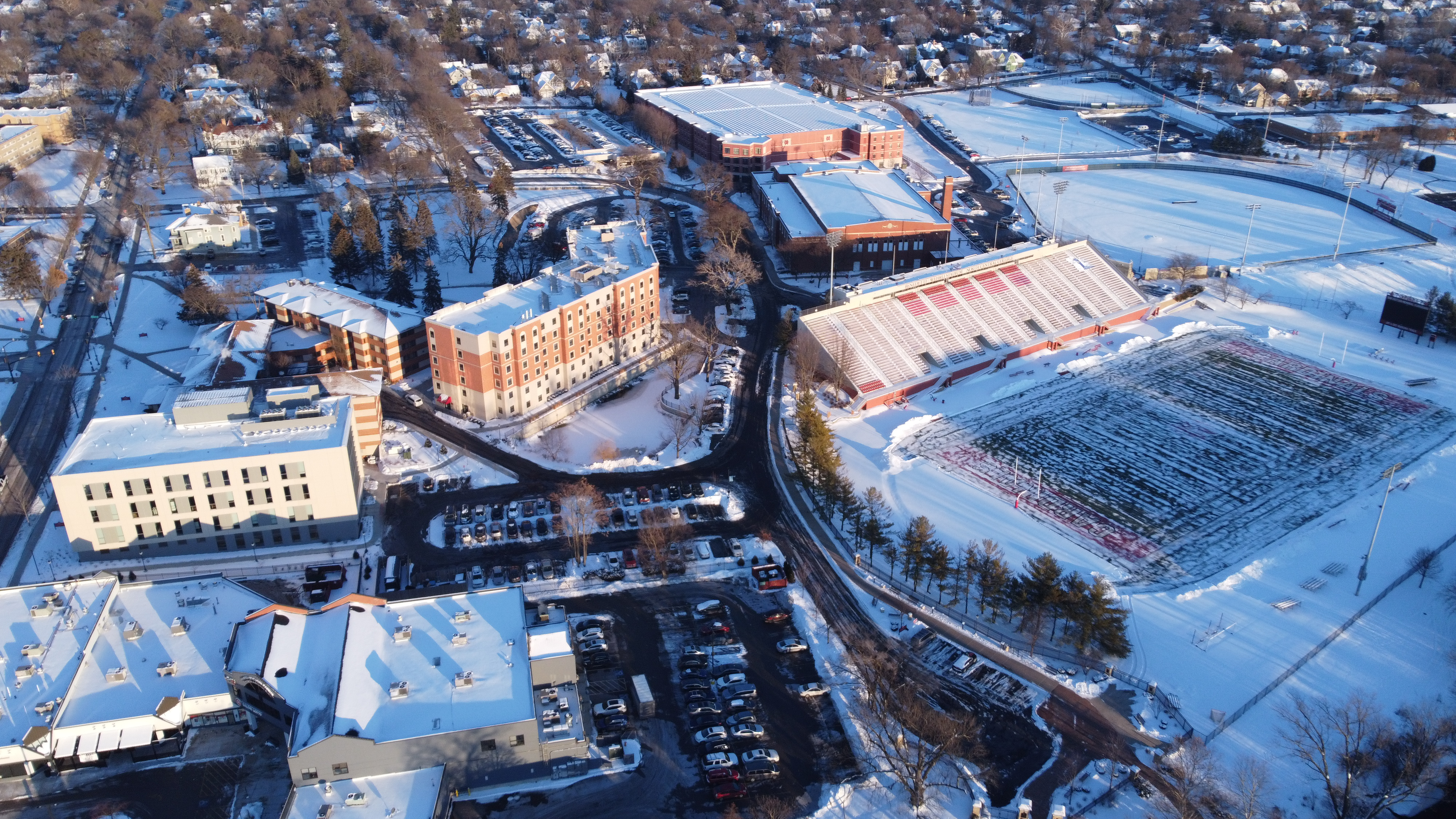
The southern portion of campus which includes many athletic facilities like the stadium and fieldhouse

Athletic facilities include Benedetti-Wehrli Stadium, which seats 5,500, was completed in 1999. The Jay and Dot Buikema track was resurfaced in 1997 and a Safeplay Plus artificial playing surface was installed in 2011. The stadium has hosted numerous high-profile events, including the Illinois high school boys and girls soccer state finals and the Wes Spencer Crosstown Classic, the annual showdown between Naperville North and Naperville Central high schools. It also served as the temporary home of the Chicago Fire for two seasons while Chicago's Soldier Field was reconstructed. In summer 2009, the stadium hosted an outdoor concert by the band Lifehouse.

North Central College's baseball facility, Zimmerman Stadium, which includes Alumni Field, was dedicated in 1999. The home of Cardinal baseball has permanent seating for 750 fans and a fully enclosed and wireless press box. The facility has hosted the Illinois High School Baseball Coaches Association summer state tournament and Major League Baseball's RBI World Series and Area Code tryouts.

Cardinal softball plays at Shanower Family Field. In April 2002, the field was dedicated to honor the family of Don Shanower, beloved professor emeritus of speech communication and theatre and enthusiastic softball fan. The dedication took on added meaning after the Shanowers' son Dan, a commander in the U.S. Navy, was among the victims of the September 11 terrorist attack on the Pentagon. The field has hosted an NCAA III regional tournament and was part of Major League Baseball's RBI World Series.

Merner Field House is home to Cardinal indoor sports except track and field, with 2,478 seats in Gregory Arena for the basketball and volleyball teams. On the second floor of Merner Field House is Nichols Gymnasium, home to the North Central College wrestling team. The college's swimming pool is also located in the Field House.

The Residence Hall/Recreation Center opened in the fall of 2009. This combination residential hall and 91,000-square-foot (8,500 m^{2}) recreational center also contains a regulation NCAA 200-meter running track and is home to the Cardinal indoor track team. The Res/Rec Center has won national acclaim due to its environmentally conscious design. The facility, with its innovative geothermal heating and cooling system and other sustainability features, has been awarded LEED Silver Certification.
