= 1911–12 New Mexico Lobos men's basketball team =

American college basketball season

1911–12 New Mexico Lobos men's basketball
- Conference: Independent
- Record: 1–2
- Head coach: Ralph Hutchinson (2nd season)

The 1911–12 New Mexico Lobos men's basketball team represented the University of New Mexico during the 1911–12 NCAA college men's basketball season. The head coach was Ralph Hutchinson, coaching his second season with the Lobos.

== Schedule ==
Date time, TV	Opponent	Result	Record	Site city, state
Jan. 6, 1912	Albuquerque Business College	L 05–12	0–1	Albuquerque, New Mexico
Jan. 12, 1912	Albuquerque High School	W 23–22	1–1	Albuquerque, New Mexico
Jan. 19, 1912	at New Mexico Highlands	L 12–19	1–2	Las Vegas, New Mexico
*Non-conference game. (#) Tournament seedings in parentheses.
