= 1910–11 NCAA men's basketball season =

Men's collegiate basketball season

- Helms National Champions: St. John's (retroactive selection in 1943)
- Player of the Year (Helms): Ted Kiendl, Columbia (retroactive selection in 1944)

The 1910–11 NCAA men's basketball season began in December 1910, progressed through the regular season, and concluded in March 1911.

== Rule changes ==
- Coaching was prohibited during the progress of the game by anyone connected with either team. The first violation resulted in a warning, and for each subsequent violation a free throw was awarded to the opposing team. Coaching during a game would not be permitted again until the 1948–49 season.
- Within "Class B" fouls — such as striking, kicking, shouldering, tripping, or hacking an opponent, unnecessary roughness, and using profane or abusive language — a distinction was introduced between personal fouls and other types of fouls.

== Season headlines ==
- The Intercollegiate Athletic Association of the United States (IAAUS) renamed itself the National Collegiate Athletic Association (NCAA) in 1910 prior to the 1910–11 basketball season.
- After a two-season hiatus and a reorganization, the Eastern Intercollegiate Basketball League resumed conference play, with five members.
- The Rocky Mountain Athletic Conference began play, with four original members.
- In February 1943, the Helms Athletic Foundation retroactively selected St. John's as its national champion for the 1910–11 season.
- In 1995, the Premo-Porretta Power Poll retroactively selected St. John's as its top-ranked team for the 1910–11 season.

== Conference membership changes ==
| School | Former Conference | New Conference |
|---|---|---|
| Colorado Silver and Gold | Independent | Rocky Mountain Athletic Conference |
| Colorado Agricultural Aggies | Independent | Rocky Mountain Athletic Conference |
| Colorado Mines Orediggers | No major basketball program | Rocky Mountain Athletic Conference |
| Columbia Lions | Independent | Eastern Intercollegiate Basketball League |
| Cornell Big Red | Independent | Eastern Intercollegiate Basketball League |
| Denver Pioneers | No major basketball program | Rocky Mountain Athletic Conference |
| Penn Quakers | Independent | Eastern Intercollegiate Basketball League |
| Princeton Tigers | Independent | Eastern Intercollegiate Basketball League |
| Yale Bulldogs | Independent | Eastern Intercollegiate Basketball League |

NOTE: Although Colorado College joined the Rocky Mountain Athletic Conference for the 1910–11 season, it did not field its first major-level basketball team until the 1913–14 season.

== Regular season ==
=== Conferences ===
==== Conference winners ====
| Conference | Regular Season Winner | Conference Player of the Year | Conference Tournament | Tournament Venue (City) | Tournament Winner |
|---|---|---|---|---|---|
| Eastern Intercollegiate Basketball League | Columbia | None selected | No Tournament | | |
| Missouri Valley Intercollegiate Athletic Association | Kansas | None selected | No Tournament | | |
| Rocky Mountain Athletic Conference | Colorado Mines | | No Tournament | | |
| Western Conference | Minnesota & Purdue | None selected | No Tournament | | |

==== Conference standings ====
1910–11 Eastern Intercollegiate Basketball League standings
| | Conf. | | | | Overall |
| Team | W | | L | PCT | W | | L | PCT |
|---|---|---|---|---|---|---|---|---|
| Columbia | 7 | – | 1 | .875 | 13 | – | 1 | .929 |
| Penn | 5 | – | 3 | .625 | 15 | – | 8 | .652 |
| Cornell | 4 | – | 4 | .500 | 7 | – | 6 | .538 |
| Yale | 3 | – | 5 | .375 | 10 | – | 11 | .476 |
| Princeton | 1 | – | 7 | .125 | 4 | – | 9 | .308 |

1910–11 Rocky Mountain Conference standings
| | Conf. | | | | Overall |
| Team | W | | L | PCT | W | | L | PCT |
|---|---|---|---|---|---|---|---|---|
| Colorado Mines | 4 | – | 0 | 1.000 | 4 | – | 0 | 1.000 |
| Colorado | 2 | – | 2 | .500 | 4 | – | 2 | .667 |
| Colorado Agricultural | 1 | – | 3 | .250 | 5 | – | 4 | .556 |
| Denver | 1 | – | 3 | .250 | 4 | – | 6 | .400 |

1910–11 Missouri Valley Intercollegiate Athletic Association men's basketball standings
| | Conf. | | | | Overall |
| Team | W | | L | PCT | W | | L | PCT |
|---|---|---|---|---|---|---|---|---|
| Kansas | 9 | – | 3 | .750 | 12 | – | 6 | .667 |
| Nebraska | 7 | – | 5 | .583 | 11 | – | 7 | .611 |
| Iowa State | 6 | – | 8 | .429 | 6 | – | 11 | .353 |
| Missouri | 4 | – | 8 | .333 | 4 | – | 8 | .333 |
| Drake | 0 | – | 2 | .000 | 0 | – | 6 | .000 |

1910–11 Western Conference men's basketball standings
| | Conf. | | | | Overall |
| Team | W | | L | PCT | W | | L | PCT |
|---|---|---|---|---|---|---|---|---|
| Purdue | 8 | – | 4 | .667 | 12 | – | 4 | .750 |
| Minnesota | 8 | – | 4 | .667 | 10 | – | 4 | .714 |
| Chicago | 7 | – | 5 | .583 | 10 | – | 4 | .714 |
| Illinois | 6 | – | 5 | .545 | 6 | – | 6 | .500 |
| Wisconsin | 6 | – | 6 | .500 | 6 | – | 6 | .500 |
| Indiana | 5 | – | 5 | .500 | 11 | – | 5 | .688 |
| Iowa | 2 | – | 2 | .500 | 9 | – | 4 | .692 |
| Northwestern | 1 | – | 12 | .077 | 4 | – | 15 | .211 |

=== Independents ===
A total of 114 college teams played as major independents. Among independents that played at least 10 games, Augustana (10–0), Dayton (10–0), North Dakota Agricultural (14–0), and St. John's (N.Y.) (14–0) were undefeated, and Lake Forest (15–4) and Denison (15–5) finished with the most wins.

1910–11 NCAA men's basketball independents standings
| | Conf. | | | | Overall |
| Team | W | | L | PCT | W | | L | PCT |
|---|---|---|---|---|---|---|---|---|
| Arizona | | – | | – | 3 | – | 0 | 1.000 |
| Augustana (Ill.) | | – | | – | 10 | – | 0 | 1.000 |
| Brigham Young | | – | | – | 8 | – | 0 | 1.000 |
| Dayton | | – | | – | 10 | – | 0 | 1.000 |
| Detroit | | – | | – | 6 | – | 0 | 1.000 |
| North Dakota Agricultural | | – | | – | 14 | – | 0 | 1.000 |
| Seton Hall | | – | | – | 4 | – | 0 | 1.000 |
| St. John's (N.Y.) | | – | | – | 14 | – | 0 | 1.000 |
| Grinnell | | – | | – | 13 | – | 1 | .929 |
| Virginia Tech | | – | | – | 11 | – | 1 | .917 |
| Washington | | – | | – | 11 | – | 1 | .917 |
| Navy | | – | | – | 10 | – | 1 | .909 |
| Wabash | | – | | – | 10 | – | 1 | .909 |
| North Central | | – | | – | 14 | – | 2 | .875 |
| Cotner | | – | | – | 13 | – | 2 | .867 |
| Montana State | | – | | – | 5 | – | 1 | .833 |
| Oberlin | | – | | – | 10 | – | 2 | .833 |
| Allegheny | | – | | – | 9 | – | 2 | .818 |
| Canisius | | – | | – | 13 | – | 3 | .813 |
| New Mexico | | – | | – | 4 | – | 1 | .800 |
| Vanderbilt | | – | | – | 8 | – | 2 | .800 |
| Williams | | – | | – | 8 | – | 2 | .800 |
| Lake Forest | | – | | – | 15 | – | 4 | .789 |
| Grove City | | – | | – | 11 | – | 3 | .786 |
| CCNY | | – | | – | 7 | – | 2 | .778 |
| Manhattan | | – | | – | 14 | – | 4 | .778 |
| Union (N.Y.) | | – | | – | 7 | – | 2 | .778 |
| Bradley | | – | | – | 10 | – | 3 | .769 |
| St. Lawrence | | – | | – | 13 | – | 4 | .765 |
| Army | | – | | – | 9 | – | 3 | .750 |
| Denison | | – | | – | 15 | – | 5 | .750 |
| Fordham | | – | | – | 12 | – | 4 | .750 |
| Ole Miss | | – | | – | 9 | – | 3 | .750 |
| Swarthmore | | – | | – | 9 | – | 3 | .750 |
| William & Mary | | – | | – | 3 | – | 1 | .750 |
| Hope | | – | | – | 11 | – | 4 | .733 |
| Wesleyan (Conn.) | | – | | – | 11 | – | 4 | .733 |
| Baylor | | – | | – | 8 | – | 3 | .727 |
| Carleton | | – | | – | 8 | – | 3 | .727 |
| LSU | | – | | – | 8 | – | 3 | .727 |
| Utah | | – | | – | 5 | – | 2 | .714 |
| Notre Dame | | – | | – | 7 | – | 3 | .700 |
| Wooster | | – | | – | 7 | – | 3 | .700 |
| Nebraska Wesleyan | | – | | – | 9 | – | 4 | .692 |
| Oregon | | – | | – | 9 | – | 4 | .692 |
| Penn State | | – | | – | 9 | – | 4 | .692 |
| Akron | | – | | – | 8 | – | 4 | .667 |
| Beloit | | – | | – | 6 | – | 3 | .667 |
| Idaho | | – | | – | 8 | – | 4 | .667 |
| Marietta | | – | | – | 8 | – | 4 | .667 |
| Ohio State | | – | | – | 6 | – | 3 | .667 |
| Saint Mary's (Calif.) | | – | | – | 2 | – | 1 | .667 |
| Southwestern (Kan.) | | – | | – | 10 | – | 5 | .667 |
| Virginia | | – | | – | 10 | – | 5 | .667 |
| Georgetown | | – | | – | 13 | – | 7 | .650 |
| North Carolina | | – | | – | 7 | – | 4 | .636 |
| Kansas State | | – | | – | 5 | – | 3 | .625 |
| Rhode Island State | | – | | – | 5 | – | 3 | .625 |
| Brown | | – | | – | 8 | – | 5 | .615 |
| New York University | | – | | – | 8 | – | 5 | .615 |
| Geneva | | – | | – | 9 | – | 6 | .600 |
| Kalamazoo | | – | | – | 3 | – | 2 | .600 |
| Southern California | | – | | – | 12 | – | 8 | .600 |
| Millikin | | – | | – | 10 | – | 7 | .588 |
| Washington and Lee | | – | | – | 11 | – | 8 | .579 |
| Trinity (N.C.) | | – | | – | 4 | – | 3 | .571 |
| Miami (Ohio) | | – | | – | 4 | – | 3 | .571 |
| Santa Clara | | – | | – | 8 | – | 6 | .571 |
| Springfield (Mass.) | | – | | – | 8 | – | 6 | .571 |
| Colgate | | – | | – | 9 | – | 7 | .563 |
| Tulane | | – | | – | 5 | – | 4 | .556 |
| Franklin | | – | | – | 6 | – | 5 | .545 |
| Delaware | | – | | – | 7 | – | 6 | .538 |
| Fairmount | | – | | – | 7 | – | 6 | .538 |
| Wake Forest | | – | | – | 8 | – | 7 | .533 |
| Gettysburg | | – | | – | 6 | – | 6 | .500 |
| Loyola (Md.) | | – | | – | 6 | – | 6 | .500 |
| Mount Union | | – | | – | 6 | – | 6 | .500 |
| Niagara | | – | | – | 7 | – | 7 | .500 |
| Pittsburgh | | – | | – | 6 | – | 6 | .500 |
| St. Joseph's | | – | | – | 6 | – | 6 | .500 |
| South Carolina | | – | | – | 1 | – | 1 | .500 |
| Bloomsburg | | – | | – | 6 | – | 7 | .462 |
| North Dakota | | – | | – | 6 | – | 7 | .462 |
| Bucknell | | – | | – | 5 | – | 6 | .455 |
| Dartmouth | | – | | – | 5 | – | 6 | .455 |
| Kentucky | | – | | – | 5 | – | 6 | .455 |
| Tennessee | | – | | – | 7 | – | 9 | .438 |
| Lehigh | | – | | – | 3 | – | 4 | .429 |
| Ohio | | – | | – | 3 | – | 4 | .429 |
| Butler | | – | | – | 5 | – | 7 | .417 |
| Auburn | | – | | – | 3 | – | 5 | .375 |
| Oregon Agricultural | | – | | – | 3 | – | 5 | .375 |
| Temple | | – | | – | 3 | – | 5 | .375 |
| VMI | | – | | – | 3 | – | 5 | .375 |
| Michigan State | | – | | – | 5 | – | 9 | .357 |
| Syracuse | | – | | – | 6 | – | 11 | .353 |
| Cincinnati | | – | | – | 3 | – | 6 | .333 |
| Connecticut | | – | | – | 1 | – | 2 | .333 |
| Mississippi A&M | | – | | – | 2 | – | 4 | .333 |
| Utah State | | – | | – | 2 | – | 4 | .333 |
| Georgia | | – | | – | 2 | – | 5 | .286 |
| Washburn | | – | | – | 1 | – | 3 | .250 |
| Wisconsin–Stevens Point | | – | | – | 1 | – | 3 | .250 |
| Indiana State | | – | | – | 2 | – | 8 | .200 |
| Texas | | – | | – | 1 | – | 4 | .200 |
| Trinity (Conn.) | | – | | – | 2 | – | 8 | .200 |
| Wyoming | | – | | – | 1 | – | 4 | .200 |
| Oklahoma | | – | | – | 1 | – | 5 | .167 |
| Washington State | | – | | – | 3 | – | 16 | .158 |
| New Mexico A&M | | – | | – | 1 | – | 9 | .100 |
| Davidson | | – | | – | 0 | – | 2 | .000 |
| Millsaps | | – | | – | 0 | – | 6 | .000 |
| Northern Colorado | | – | | – | 0 | – | 2 | .000 |

== Awards ==
=== Helms College Basketball All-Americans ===
The practice of selecting a Consensus All-American Team did not begin until the 1928–29 season. The Helms Athletic Foundation later retroactively selected a list of All-Americans for the 1910–11 season.

| Player | Team |
|---|---|
| A. D. Alexander | Columbia |
| Dave Charters | Purdue |
| C. C. Clementson | Washington |
| Harry W. Hill | Navy |
| John Keenan | St. John's (NY) |
| Ted Kiendl | Columbia |
| Frank Lawler | Minnesota |
| W. M. Lee | Columbia |
| Walter Scoville | Wisconsin |
| Lewis Walton | Penn |

=== Major player of the year awards ===
- Helms Player of the Year: Ted Kiendl, Columbia (retroactive selection in 1944)

== Coaching changes ==
A number of teams changed coaches during the season and after it ended.

| Team | Former Coach | Interim Coach | New Coach | Reason |
|---|---|---|---|---|
| Army | Joseph Stilwell | | Harvey Higley | |
| Bucknell | George W. Hoskins | | C. Fulmer | |
| BYU | Henry Rose | | E. L. Roberts | |
| Colorado Agricultural | George Cassidy | | Harry W. Hughes | |
| Dartmouth | Tom Keady | | Francis Brady | |
| Dayton | William O'Malley | | Harry Solimano | |
| Denver | Charles Wingender | | Clem Crowley | |
| Georgetown | Maurice Joyce | | James Colliflower | Joyce retired from coaching after the end of the season. |
| Georgia | W. A. Cunningham | | Howell Peacock | |
| Indiana | Oscar Rackle | | James Kase | |
| Indiana State | John Kimmell | | Bertram Wiggins | |
| Iowa State | Clyde Williams | | Homer C. Hubbard | |
| Kansas State | Mike Ahearn | | Guy Lowman | |
| Kentucky | Harold Iddings | | Edwin Sweetland | |
| LSU | John W. Mayhew | | F. M. Long | |
| Mississippi A&M | W. D. Chadwick | | Earl C. Hayes | |
| Missouri | Chester Brewer | | Osmond F. Field | |
| Montana State | John H. McIntosh | | Earnest A. Dockstader | |
| Navy | Bernard Willis | | George F. Jacobs | |
| Nebraska | Osmond F. Field | | Ewald O. Stiehm | Field left to coach Missouri. |
| Niagara | Alfred Heerdt | | A. V.Barnett | |
| Northwestern | Stuart Templeton | | Charle Hammett | |
| Ohio | John Corbett | | Arthur Hinaman | |
| Ole Miss | E. R. Hubbard | | By Walton | |
| Oregon State | Clifford Reed | | E. J. Stewart | |
| Pittsburgh | Wohlparth Wegner | | George Flint | |
| Princeton | Harry Shorter | | Harry Hough | |
| Saint Joseph's | Edward Bennis | | John Donahue | |
| Seton Hall | Jim Flanagan | | Frank Hill | |
| St. John's | Claude Allen | | Joseph O'Shea | |
| Tennessee | Lex Stone | | Zora Clevenger | |
| Texas | W. E. Metzenthin | | J. Burton Rix | |
| USC | J. S. Robson | | Walter Hall | |
| VMI | J. Mitchell | | Alpha Brumage | |
| Wisconsin | Haskell Noyes | | Walter Meanwell | |
| Yale | Billy Lush | | R. B. Hyatt | |
