= 1910–11 North Carolina Tar Heels men's basketball team =

American college basketball season

1910–11 North Carolina Tar Heels men's basketball
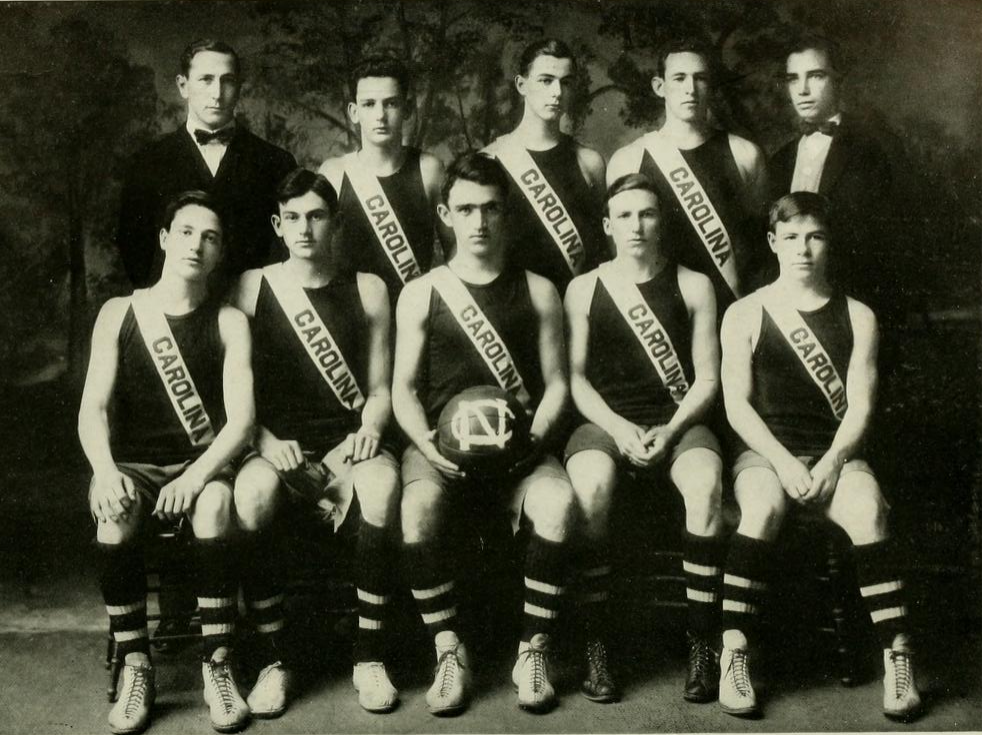
- Conference: Independent
- Record: 7–4
- Head coach: Nathaniel Cartmell (1st season)
- Captain: Marvin Ritch
- Home arena: Bynum Gymnasium

1910–11 NCAA men's basketball independents standings
	Conf.				Overall
Team	W		L	PCT	W		L	PCT
Arizona		–		–	3	–	0	1.000
Augustana (Ill.)		–		–	10	–	0	1.000
Brigham Young		–		–	8	–	0	1.000
Dayton		–		–	10	–	0	1.000
Detroit		–		–	6	–	0	1.000
North Dakota Agricultural		–		–	14	–	0	1.000
Seton Hall		–		–	4	–	0	1.000
St. John's (N.Y.)		–		–	14	–	0	1.000
Grinnell		–		–	13	–	1	.929
Virginia Tech		–		–	11	–	1	.917
Washington		–		–	11	–	1	.917
Navy		–		–	10	–	1	.909
Wabash		–		–	10	–	1	.909
North Central		–		–	14	–	2	.875
Cotner		–		–	13	–	2	.867
Montana State		–		–	5	–	1	.833
Oberlin		–		–	10	–	2	.833
Allegheny		–		–	9	–	2	.818
Canisius		–		–	13	–	3	.813
New Mexico		–		–	4	–	1	.800
Vanderbilt		–		–	8	–	2	.800
Williams		–		–	8	–	2	.800
Lake Forest		–		–	15	–	4	.789
Grove City		–		–	11	–	3	.786
CCNY		–		–	7	–	2	.778
Manhattan		–		–	14	–	4	.778
Union (N.Y.)		–		–	7	–	2	.778
Bradley		–		–	10	–	3	.769
St. Lawrence		–		–	13	–	4	.765
Army		–		–	9	–	3	.750
Denison		–		–	15	–	5	.750
Fordham		–		–	12	–	4	.750
Ole Miss		–		–	9	–	3	.750
Swarthmore		–		–	9	–	3	.750
William & Mary		–		–	3	–	1	.750
Hope		–		–	11	–	4	.733
Wesleyan (Conn.)		–		–	11	–	4	.733
Baylor		–		–	8	–	3	.727
Carleton		–		–	8	–	3	.727
LSU		–		–	8	–	3	.727
Utah		–		–	5	–	2	.714
Notre Dame		–		–	7	–	3	.700
Wooster		–		–	7	–	3	.700
Nebraska Wesleyan		–		–	9	–	4	.692
Oregon		–		–	9	–	4	.692
Penn State		–		–	9	–	4	.692
Akron		–		–	8	–	4	.667
Beloit		–		–	6	–	3	.667
Idaho		–		–	8	–	4	.667
Marietta		–		–	8	–	4	.667
Ohio State		–		–	6	–	3	.667
Saint Mary's (Calif.)		–		–	2	–	1	.667
Southwestern (Kan.)		–		–	10	–	5	.667
Virginia		–		–	10	–	5	.667
Georgetown		–		–	13	–	7	.650
North Carolina		–		–	7	–	4	.636
Kansas State		–		–	5	–	3	.625
Rhode Island State		–		–	5	–	3	.625
Brown		–		–	8	–	5	.615
New York University		–		–	8	–	5	.615
Geneva		–		–	9	–	6	.600
Kalamazoo		–		–	3	–	2	.600
Southern California		–		–	12	–	8	.600
Millikin		–		–	10	–	7	.588
Washington and Lee		–		–	11	–	8	.579
Trinity (N.C.)		–		–	4	–	3	.571
Miami (Ohio)		–		–	4	–	3	.571
Santa Clara		–		–	8	–	6	.571
Springfield (Mass.)		–		–	8	–	6	.571
Colgate		–		–	9	–	7	.563
Tulane		–		–	5	–	4	.556
Franklin		–		–	6	–	5	.545
Delaware		–		–	7	–	6	.538
Fairmount		–		–	7	–	6	.538
Wake Forest		–		–	8	–	7	.533
Gettysburg		–		–	6	–	6	.500
Loyola (Md.)		–		–	6	–	6	.500
Mount Union		–		–	6	–	6	.500
Niagara		–		–	7	–	7	.500
Pittsburgh		–		–	6	–	6	.500
St. Joseph's		–		–	6	–	6	.500
South Carolina		–		–	1	–	1	.500
Bloomsburg		–		–	6	–	7	.462
North Dakota		–		–	6	–	7	.462
Bucknell		–		–	5	–	6	.455
Dartmouth		–		–	5	–	6	.455
Kentucky		–		–	5	–	6	.455
Tennessee		–		–	7	–	9	.438
Lehigh		–		–	3	–	4	.429
Ohio		–		–	3	–	4	.429
Butler		–		–	5	–	7	.417
Auburn		–		–	3	–	5	.375
Oregon Agricultural		–		–	3	–	5	.375
Temple		–		–	3	–	5	.375
VMI		–		–	3	–	5	.375
Michigan State		–		–	5	–	9	.357
Syracuse		–		–	6	–	11	.353
Cincinnati		–		–	3	–	6	.333
Connecticut		–		–	1	–	2	.333
Mississippi A&M		–		–	2	–	4	.333
Utah State		–		–	2	–	4	.333
Georgia		–		–	2	–	5	.286
Washburn		–		–	1	–	3	.250
Wisconsin–Stevens Point		–		–	1	–	3	.250
Indiana State		–		–	2	–	8	.200
Texas		–		–	1	–	4	.200
Trinity (Conn.)		–		–	2	–	8	.200
Wyoming		–		–	1	–	4	.200
Oklahoma		–		–	1	–	5	.167
Washington State		–		–	3	–	16	.158
New Mexico A&M		–		–	1	–	9	.100
Davidson		–		–	0	–	2	.000
Millsaps		–		–	0	–	6	.000
Northern Colorado		–		–	0	–	2	.000

The 1910–11 North Carolina Tar Heels men's basketball team (variously "North Carolina", "Carolina" or "Tar Heels") was the first varsity college basketball team to represent the University of North Carolina. (Note: The school was known as the University of North Carolina until February 1963.) The school created a committee to determine if the school should go forward with forming a team as there was increasing pressure from students, the student run newspaper The Tar Heel, in-state schools that fielded teams who wanted to form a state league, and the University of Tennessee inquired about scheduling a game in February 1911. Equipment was purchased and installed at Bynum Gymnasium after a period of uncertainty of where the team would play its home games. Then track-and-field head coach Nathaniel Cartmell – who had little experience with basketball – was chosen to coach as there were no funds to be allocated for hiring another coach. After choosing players for the first team, Cartmell finalized the schedule in January, which was limited as many other programs had already created their schedules before the Tar Heels made their team.

North Carolina opened their season with a victory against Virginia Christian 42–21 in front of an estimated 200 spectators. The squad won their next four games, winning by double digits against two opponents and by three or less against the other two. The team traveled to Wake Forest where they lost their first game after the Baptists handily outscored the Tar Heels in the second half. The team rebounded with a win against University of Tennessee before they dropped two closely contested games against Virginia and Virginia Christian. Carolina defeated Woodberry Forest easily before they played their final game, a rematch, against Virginia. Virginia won the game after taking a lead into halftime and only being outscored by two points in the second half, despite one player from each team being ejected following an altercation where a North Carolina player bit a Virginia player on the shoulder. The team was viewed as a success and thought to have played their hardest in each game this led The Tar Heel to write that "... basketball has come to stay."

== Formation ==
Basketball was first played at the University of North Carolina as early as 1903, but it was formally introduced in 1906 by Dr. Robert Lawson. Lawson obtained a rule book, placed peach baskets for rims and fielded a team. During the 1909–10 academic year there was a school group that played basketball and had their photo published in the school annual The Yackety Yack. In late 1910, students showed an eagerness to field a basketball team when the editors of The Tar Heel published articles in the newspapers and mentioned it would "relieve some of that January and February monotony." In addition, Wake Forest College showed interest in creating a statewide basketball league. On September 24, 1910, student Marvin Ritch who had been away from the university previously, returned, prompting The Tar Heel editors expressed their hope again for him to form a team and schedule games. Four days later, it was revealed that University of Tennessee had inquired about scheduling a basketball game on February 24. The following week, The Tar Heel commented that "Carolina will certainly have a basketball team this winter," as well as mentioning that former Olympian and current track-and-field coach Nathaniel Cartmell was interested in fielding a team. The writers continued, stating that basketball interest had waned on campus in the years prior and some had even considered cutting up the basketball area for tennis courts.

A four–person committee was formed to investigate the "advisability" of forming a basketball team at the school. The committee determined several matters including: basketball was popular in college sports, many leading Southern colleges and universities had established teams which were as popular as other varsity sports, and it would be a source of revenue. One issue was found as the team would have no were to play, but despite this, the committee suggested the school form a team at once. By the end of November, the a home court had yet to be determined, to which The Tar Heel editors suggested Memorial Hall since it was only used two or three times a year then. In addition, former Olympian and current track and field coach Cartmell had been named head coach. It was revealed later that there weren't funds to hire another coach, so Cartmell was approached even though knew little about basketball. On December 3, a basketball "apparatus" was ordered and upon its installation in Bynum Gymnasium and that practices would be from 7 to 9 PM. The baskets were installed on December 12 and each night after that students showed up to practice at the set time, with around 25 coming the first night. The practice that night reportedly had slick floors and backboards were "too lively."

== Roster and schedule ==
1910–11 North Carolina Tar Heels roster
Name	Position	Height	Year	Hometown
George Carrington	C	6–3	Sophomore	Durham, North Carolina
Ferdinand Duls	G	5–9	Senior	Wilmington, North Carolina
John Floyd (Note: John Floyd appeared in the Tar Heels' game against the Durham Y.M.C.A. as a center,. but does not appear in the Tar Heels' 2018–2019 Record Book. Adam Lucas's book lists Floyd as a team member, but leaves off John Hanes who appeared in games against: the Charlotte Y.M.C.A., Davidson, the Durham Y.M.C.A., Tennessee, both Wake Forest games, and both Virginia games.)	C	–	–	–
John Hanes	G	6–0	Freshman	Winston-Salem, North Carolina
Cyrus Long	G	5–10	Freshman	Charlotte, North Carolina
Roy McKnight	F (Note: Roy McKnight and William "Bill" Wakeley are listed as letterman for the 1910–11 season; however, they did not appear in a game. In 2021, The Tar Heels: A History of UNC Basketball, Volume One, 1891-1961 reported that they both played Forward.)	6–0	Freshman	Charlotte, North Carolina (Note: Roy McKnight's hometown is listed as Charlotte, North Carolina in the 1911 Yackety Yack, while it is listed as Chapel Hill, North Carolina in the Carolina Basketball 2018-19 Facts & Records Book.)
Marvin Ritch	C, G	6–1	Sophomore	Charlotte, North Carolina
Junius Smith	F	6–2	Freshman	Charlotte, North Carolina
William "Bill" Tillett	F	5–6	Sophomore	Charlotte, North Carolina
William "Bill" Wakeley	F	5–11	Junior	Orange, New Jersey

Schedule
Date time, TV	Opponent	Result	Record	Site city, state
Regular season
January 27, 1911*	Virginia Christian	W 42–21	1–0	Bynum Gymnasium; Chapel Hill, North Carolina
February 1, 1911*	Durham Y.M.C.A.	W 60–18	2–0	Bynum Gymnasium; Chapel Hill, North Carolina
February 3, 1911*	Wake Forest	W 31–28	3–0	Bynum Gymnasium; Chapel Hill, North Carolina
February 8, 1911*	Davidson	W 27–25	4–0	Bynum Gymnasium; Chapel Hill, North Carolina
February 15, 1911*	Charlotte Y.M.C.A.	W 42–28	5–0	Bynum Gymnasium; Chapel Hill, North Carolina
February 18, 1911*	at Wake Forest	L 16–38	5–1	Wake Forest, North Carolina
February 21, 1911*	Tennessee	W 40–21	6–1	Bynum Gymnasium; Chapel Hill, North Carolina
February 24, 1911*	Virginia	L 15–18	6–2	Bynum Gymnasium; Chapel Hill, North Carolina
February 27, 1911*	at Virginia Christian	L 31–33 ^{OT}	6–3	Lynchburg Y.M.C.A. Lynchburg, Virginia
February 28, 1911*	at Woodberry Forest	W 23–11	7–3	Orange, Virginia
March 1, 1911*	at Virginia	L 16–24	7–4	Fayerweather Gymnasium; Charlottesville, Virginia
*Non-conference game. ^{#}Rankings from AP Poll. (#) Tournament seedings in parentheses. All times are in Eastern Time.

== Regular season ==
Don't worry about trying to be the leading scorer. Play for the team and forget yourself.

— Marvin Ritch to his teammates prior to the program's first game on January 27, 1911

Coach Cartmell also had the duty of scheduling the games for the newly formed basketball team, along with serving as the referee or umpire depending on the half. The preliminary schedule was announced in mid–January and was noted to be difficult to make as most schools had their schedules already created by the point Cartmell began the process. In total there were eleven games and it was found to be a good schedule as it included "some of the best teams of this and other States." The team's first game was a home game against Virginia Christian on January 27. Before the game, captain Ritch told the team "... play for team and forget yourself." The Tar Heel commented that the North Carolina players looked nervous in the opening minutes and, despite this, neither team got an advantage greater than five in the first half. Entering half–time the score was 13–11 Carolina. At halftime, Cartmell cursed at the team "good and artistically" before the action resumed and Caroline opened the first five minutes of the half making five baskets to Virginia Christian's nil. Virginia Christian began to play better following, but it did not prove enough as the Tar Heels won 42–21. The Tar Heel wrote that the game was attended by "a number of people" which they estimated to be around 200 people, which they speculated most had not seen a basketball game contested before and stated they left happy with the experience.

The next opponent was the Durham Y.M.C.A. in a game where the referee called several fouls and the pace of the game was very slow. Carolina won handily 60–18, while 10 of the Y.M.C.A.'s points came as a result of fouls. No individual stats were recorded for the first three games of the season. The Wake Forest Anti-bonders (variously "Baptists" and "Water Babies") traveled to Chapel Hill where the two played a close game. North Carolina led the whole game, but primarily over a margin of 3 points. The Tar Heel wrote that the Baptists had better team chemistry, but just did not make the easy shots that received. The Baptists were led by strong performances from Turner and Dowd, but were unable to overcome the Tar Heels' advantage and lost the game 28–31. Following their third straight victory, The Tar Heel wrote that the players should not think they're the best in the South and that they needed to improve their passing and general teamwork. Carolina squared off against the Davidson Predestinarians next on February 8. The Tar Heels scored 15 points to Davidson's 8 in the first half; however, Davidson played much better defense in the second half and were able to score several baskets. Their efforts fell short as they lost 27–25. The Charlotte Y.M.C.A. team came to Chapel Hill for the next match–up on February 15, where the Tar Heels won the game 42–28 after being separated by four points at halftime. It was not that the team showed improved passing relative to previous outings. Ritch scored a season high 18 points, which broke the early program record set by Tillet against Davidson when he had 8 points. (Note: Scores were not officially kept for the first three games of the season against Virginia Christian, Durham Y.M.C.A., and Wake Forest, so this record reflects the final eight games of the season.)

Next on the schedule was a rematch against Wake Forest in the team's first away game. The Baptists and Tar Heels stayed close in the first half as the Baptists held a slight lead at 15–10 entering the half. The second half was dominated by Wake Forest as they scored 23 points to Carolina's 6, bringing the final score to 38–16 and handing the Tar Heels their program's first loss. The Tar Heel reported that the Carolina squad played "decidedly off color" and lacked their usual game, while The Charlotte Observer reported it was the "toughest game of basketball ever on the home field of Wake Forest..." Tennessee traveled to Chapel Hill for the next game, which was played in Bynum Gymnasium following a dance and the floor was "slick" and preventing the team's from playing fast. Despite this, Carolina outscored Tennessee 26–6 in the first half and maintained the lead for the remainder, closing it out 40–21. In advance of the next game against Virginia, The Tar Heel stressed the game's importance as it read: "... we are ready to do anything that is fair and square to beat the Old Dominion representative." The rules for the game were different than the seven Carolina had played prior, Virginia played the game under intercollegiate rules which allowed dribbling. Previously, the Tar Heels had played under the Y.M.C.A.'s rules. In addition, Virginia's players all outweighed the Tar Heels'. In front of a crowd of 400, the game remained scoreless for the first four minutes before Virginia opened the game's scoring. Virginia and Carolina entered halftime tied at 9–9 after Ritch making a foul shot and Hanes making a "difficult" shot. Virginia stretched their lead to four, at 13–9, upon the opening of the half. Carolina managed to close the gap to one, 16–15. With two minutes remaining, the North Carolina's Ritch missed a shot and the next possession saw the Haynes miss a foul shot to level the score. Virginia made one more basket before time expired, to bring the final score to 18–15.

The Tar Heels traveled to Lynchburg, Virginia for a rematch against Virginia Christian. Carolina had the advantage at the half 17–12, but the Christians rallied and in the closing seconds the score was level at 31 apiece. Virginia Christian's Stickley sunk a shot in overtime to give the Christians the win 33–31. The following day, the Tar Heels played against Woodberry Forest in what was described as a slow game where the home team Woodberry was "outclassed." After the Tar Heels' victory, coach Cartmell felt his team's performance was poor and said: "They are on a bloody slump." The final game of the season took place in at Virginia's home venue. Virginia won the first half with a score of 16–7. In the second half, Ritch bit Virginia's Bertram on the shoulder and then hit the ground. Both were subsequently ejected. Virginia's early advantage proved to be enough as the Tar Heels outscored Virginia in the second half 9–7, bringing the final score to 24–16. The Tar Heel wrote that North Carolina shot poorly throughout the game and thus Virginia did not have to try its best after establishing the early lead. Ritch closed the season as the leading scorer with 76 points.

== Aftermath and legacy ==
The Charlotte Observer wrote after North Carolina's loss to Wake Forest that the team was very good considering it was their first year and expected them to be one of the best in the South in a few years time. Following the team's final game, The Tar Heel wrote that the season was a success, the students supported the squad well, and felt that "... basketball has come to stay." The newspaper writers felt that the team fought "like snarling cats" in each game. It further stated that Virginia was one of the best teams in the South and thus their losses their did not look bad. Four of the team's members were from Charlotte and planned to play together in the summer, which The Tar Heel felt would make for a "well trained team next year." The Greensboro Daily News agreed and stated the Tar Heels performance for the season was "beyond expectations."
