= 1910–11 Niagara Purple Eagles men's basketball team =

American college basketball season

1910–11 Niagara Purple Eagles men's basketball
- Conference: Independent
- Record: 7–7
- Head coach: Alfred Heerdt (1st season)

1910–11 NCAA men's basketball independents standings
	Conf.				Overall
Team	W		L	PCT	W		L	PCT
Arizona		–		–	3	–	0	1.000
Augustana (Ill.)		–		–	10	–	0	1.000
Brigham Young		–		–	8	–	0	1.000
Dayton		–		–	10	–	0	1.000
Detroit		–		–	6	–	0	1.000
North Dakota Agricultural		–		–	14	–	0	1.000
Seton Hall		–		–	4	–	0	1.000
St. John's (N.Y.)		–		–	14	–	0	1.000
Grinnell		–		–	13	–	1	.929
Virginia Tech		–		–	11	–	1	.917
Washington		–		–	11	–	1	.917
Navy		–		–	10	–	1	.909
Wabash		–		–	10	–	1	.909
North Central		–		–	14	–	2	.875
Cotner		–		–	13	–	2	.867
Montana State		–		–	5	–	1	.833
Oberlin		–		–	10	–	2	.833
Allegheny		–		–	9	–	2	.818
Canisius		–		–	13	–	3	.813
New Mexico		–		–	4	–	1	.800
Vanderbilt		–		–	8	–	2	.800
Williams		–		–	8	–	2	.800
Lake Forest		–		–	15	–	4	.789
Grove City		–		–	11	–	3	.786
CCNY		–		–	7	–	2	.778
Manhattan		–		–	14	–	4	.778
Union (N.Y.)		–		–	7	–	2	.778
Bradley		–		–	10	–	3	.769
St. Lawrence		–		–	13	–	4	.765
Army		–		–	9	–	3	.750
Denison		–		–	15	–	5	.750
Fordham		–		–	12	–	4	.750
Ole Miss		–		–	9	–	3	.750
Swarthmore		–		–	9	–	3	.750
William & Mary		–		–	3	–	1	.750
Hope		–		–	11	–	4	.733
Wesleyan (Conn.)		–		–	11	–	4	.733
Baylor		–		–	8	–	3	.727
Carleton		–		–	8	–	3	.727
LSU		–		–	8	–	3	.727
Utah		–		–	5	–	2	.714
Notre Dame		–		–	7	–	3	.700
Wooster		–		–	7	–	3	.700
Nebraska Wesleyan		–		–	9	–	4	.692
Oregon		–		–	9	–	4	.692
Penn State		–		–	9	–	4	.692
Akron		–		–	8	–	4	.667
Beloit		–		–	6	–	3	.667
Idaho		–		–	8	–	4	.667
Marietta		–		–	8	–	4	.667
Ohio State		–		–	6	–	3	.667
Saint Mary's (Calif.)		–		–	2	–	1	.667
Southwestern (Kan.)		–		–	10	–	5	.667
Virginia		–		–	10	–	5	.667
Georgetown		–		–	13	–	7	.650
North Carolina		–		–	7	–	4	.636
Kansas State		–		–	5	–	3	.625
Rhode Island State		–		–	5	–	3	.625
Brown		–		–	8	–	5	.615
New York University		–		–	8	–	5	.615
Geneva		–		–	9	–	6	.600
Kalamazoo		–		–	3	–	2	.600
Southern California		–		–	12	–	8	.600
Millikin		–		–	10	–	7	.588
Washington and Lee		–		–	11	–	8	.579
Trinity (N.C.)		–		–	4	–	3	.571
Miami (Ohio)		–		–	4	–	3	.571
Santa Clara		–		–	8	–	6	.571
Springfield (Mass.)		–		–	8	–	6	.571
Colgate		–		–	9	–	7	.563
Tulane		–		–	5	–	4	.556
Franklin		–		–	6	–	5	.545
Delaware		–		–	7	–	6	.538
Fairmount		–		–	7	–	6	.538
Wake Forest		–		–	8	–	7	.533
Gettysburg		–		–	6	–	6	.500
Loyola (Md.)		–		–	6	–	6	.500
Mount Union		–		–	6	–	6	.500
Niagara		–		–	7	–	7	.500
Pittsburgh		–		–	6	–	6	.500
St. Joseph's		–		–	6	–	6	.500
South Carolina		–		–	1	–	1	.500
Bloomsburg		–		–	6	–	7	.462
North Dakota		–		–	6	–	7	.462
Bucknell		–		–	5	–	6	.455
Dartmouth		–		–	5	–	6	.455
Kentucky		–		–	5	–	6	.455
Tennessee		–		–	7	–	9	.438
Lehigh		–		–	3	–	4	.429
Ohio		–		–	3	–	4	.429
Butler		–		–	5	–	7	.417
Auburn		–		–	3	–	5	.375
Oregon Agricultural		–		–	3	–	5	.375
Temple		–		–	3	–	5	.375
VMI		–		–	3	–	5	.375
Michigan State		–		–	5	–	9	.357
Syracuse		–		–	6	–	11	.353
Cincinnati		–		–	3	–	6	.333
Connecticut		–		–	1	–	2	.333
Mississippi A&M		–		–	2	–	4	.333
Utah State		–		–	2	–	4	.333
Georgia		–		–	2	–	5	.286
Washburn		–		–	1	–	3	.250
Wisconsin–Stevens Point		–		–	1	–	3	.250
Indiana State		–		–	2	–	8	.200
Texas		–		–	1	–	4	.200
Trinity (Conn.)		–		–	2	–	8	.200
Wyoming		–		–	1	–	4	.200
Oklahoma		–		–	1	–	5	.167
Washington State		–		–	3	–	16	.158
New Mexico A&M		–		–	1	–	9	.100
Davidson		–		–	0	–	2	.000
Millsaps		–		–	0	–	6	.000
Northern Colorado		–		–	0	–	2	.000

The 1910–11 Niagara Purple Eagles men's basketball team represented Niagara University during the 1910–11 NCAA college men's basketball season. The head coach was Alfred Heerdt, coaching his first season with the Purple Eagles.

== Schedule ==
Date time, TV	Opponent	Result	Record	Site city, state
	Rochester YMCA	W 32–15	1–0	Lewiston, NY
	Albright	W 37–10	2–0	Lewiston, NY
	Medina	W 72–0	3–0	Lewiston, NY
	at Cornell	L 15–48	3–1	Lewiston, NY
12/13/1910	Canisius	L 17–18	3–2	Buffalo, NY
12/18/1910	Canisius	W 33–18	4–2	Lewiston, NY
	Crescent A.C.	L 19–33	4–3	Lewiston, NY
	Brooklyn Polytech	W 25–21	5–3	Lewiston, NY
1/11/1911	at St. John's	L 17–29	5–4	Queens, NY
1/21/1911	Syracuse	L 22–41	5–5	Lewiston, NY
	Dean Academy	W 48–21	6–5	Lewiston, NY
	Buffalo Germans	L 20–44	6–6	Lewiston, NY
	Buffalo Germans	L 19–81	6–7	Lewiston, NY
	Rochester Centrals	W 29–20	7–7	Lewiston, NY
*Non-conference game. (#) Tournament seedings in parentheses.
