= 1910–11 Georgetown Hoyas men's basketball team =

American college basketball season

1910–11 Georgetown Hoyas men's basketball
- Conference: Independent
- Record: 13–7
- Head coach: Maurice Joyce (4th season)
- Captain: Frank Schlosser
- Home arena: Arcade Rink

1910–11 NCAA men's basketball independents standings
	Conf.				Overall
Team	W		L	PCT	W		L	PCT
Arizona		–		–	3	–	0	1.000
Augustana (Ill.)		–		–	10	–	0	1.000
Brigham Young		–		–	8	–	0	1.000
Dayton		–		–	10	–	0	1.000
Detroit		–		–	6	–	0	1.000
North Dakota Agricultural		–		–	14	–	0	1.000
Seton Hall		–		–	4	–	0	1.000
St. John's (N.Y.)		–		–	14	–	0	1.000
Grinnell		–		–	13	–	1	.929
Virginia Tech		–		–	11	–	1	.917
Washington		–		–	11	–	1	.917
Navy		–		–	10	–	1	.909
Wabash		–		–	10	–	1	.909
North Central		–		–	14	–	2	.875
Cotner		–		–	13	–	2	.867
Montana State		–		–	5	–	1	.833
Oberlin		–		–	10	–	2	.833
Allegheny		–		–	9	–	2	.818
Canisius		–		–	13	–	3	.813
New Mexico		–		–	4	–	1	.800
Vanderbilt		–		–	8	–	2	.800
Williams		–		–	8	–	2	.800
Lake Forest		–		–	15	–	4	.789
Grove City		–		–	11	–	3	.786
CCNY		–		–	7	–	2	.778
Manhattan		–		–	14	–	4	.778
Union (N.Y.)		–		–	7	–	2	.778
Bradley		–		–	10	–	3	.769
St. Lawrence		–		–	13	–	4	.765
Army		–		–	9	–	3	.750
Denison		–		–	15	–	5	.750
Fordham		–		–	12	–	4	.750
Ole Miss		–		–	9	–	3	.750
Swarthmore		–		–	9	–	3	.750
William & Mary		–		–	3	–	1	.750
Hope		–		–	11	–	4	.733
Wesleyan (Conn.)		–		–	11	–	4	.733
Baylor		–		–	8	–	3	.727
Carleton		–		–	8	–	3	.727
LSU		–		–	8	–	3	.727
Utah		–		–	5	–	2	.714
Notre Dame		–		–	7	–	3	.700
Wooster		–		–	7	–	3	.700
Nebraska Wesleyan		–		–	9	–	4	.692
Oregon		–		–	9	–	4	.692
Penn State		–		–	9	–	4	.692
Akron		–		–	8	–	4	.667
Beloit		–		–	6	–	3	.667
Idaho		–		–	8	–	4	.667
Marietta		–		–	8	–	4	.667
Ohio State		–		–	6	–	3	.667
Saint Mary's (Calif.)		–		–	2	–	1	.667
Southwestern (Kan.)		–		–	10	–	5	.667
Virginia		–		–	10	–	5	.667
Georgetown		–		–	13	–	7	.650
North Carolina		–		–	7	–	4	.636
Kansas State		–		–	5	–	3	.625
Rhode Island State		–		–	5	–	3	.625
Brown		–		–	8	–	5	.615
New York University		–		–	8	–	5	.615
Geneva		–		–	9	–	6	.600
Kalamazoo		–		–	3	–	2	.600
Southern California		–		–	12	–	8	.600
Millikin		–		–	10	–	7	.588
Washington and Lee		–		–	11	–	8	.579
Trinity (N.C.)		–		–	4	–	3	.571
Miami (Ohio)		–		–	4	–	3	.571
Santa Clara		–		–	8	–	6	.571
Springfield (Mass.)		–		–	8	–	6	.571
Colgate		–		–	9	–	7	.563
Tulane		–		–	5	–	4	.556
Franklin		–		–	6	–	5	.545
Delaware		–		–	7	–	6	.538
Fairmount		–		–	7	–	6	.538
Wake Forest		–		–	8	–	7	.533
Gettysburg		–		–	6	–	6	.500
Loyola (Md.)		–		–	6	–	6	.500
Mount Union		–		–	6	–	6	.500
Niagara		–		–	7	–	7	.500
Pittsburgh		–		–	6	–	6	.500
St. Joseph's		–		–	6	–	6	.500
South Carolina		–		–	1	–	1	.500
Bloomsburg		–		–	6	–	7	.462
North Dakota		–		–	6	–	7	.462
Bucknell		–		–	5	–	6	.455
Dartmouth		–		–	5	–	6	.455
Kentucky		–		–	5	–	6	.455
Tennessee		–		–	7	–	9	.438
Lehigh		–		–	3	–	4	.429
Ohio		–		–	3	–	4	.429
Butler		–		–	5	–	7	.417
Auburn		–		–	3	–	5	.375
Oregon Agricultural		–		–	3	–	5	.375
Temple		–		–	3	–	5	.375
VMI		–		–	3	–	5	.375
Michigan State		–		–	5	–	9	.357
Syracuse		–		–	6	–	11	.353
Cincinnati		–		–	3	–	6	.333
Connecticut		–		–	1	–	2	.333
Mississippi A&M		–		–	2	–	4	.333
Utah State		–		–	2	–	4	.333
Georgia		–		–	2	–	5	.286
Washburn		–		–	1	–	3	.250
Wisconsin–Stevens Point		–		–	1	–	3	.250
Indiana State		–		–	2	–	8	.200
Texas		–		–	1	–	4	.200
Trinity (Conn.)		–		–	2	–	8	.200
Wyoming		–		–	1	–	4	.200
Oklahoma		–		–	1	–	5	.167
Washington State		–		–	3	–	16	.158
New Mexico A&M		–		–	1	–	9	.100
Davidson		–		–	0	–	2	.000
Millsaps		–		–	0	–	6	.000
Northern Colorado		–		–	0	–	2	.000

The 1910–11 Georgetown Hoyas men's basketball team represented Georgetown University during the 1910–11 Intercollegiate Athletic Association of the United States (IAAUS) college basketball season. Maurice Joyce coached the team in his fourth and final season as head coach. Georgetown was an independent and for the first time played its home games at the Arcade Rink, also known as the Arcadia and as the Arcade Auditorium, in Washington, D.C., except for an early game played on the Georgetown campus at Ryan Gymnasium. It finished the season with a record of 13–7.

== Season recap ==
Junior forward-center Frank Schlosser led the team in scoring for the third straight year. He had his best season, playing in 19 games and scoring a career-high 247 points and averaging a career-high 13.0 points per game. His 26 points against Catholic was a school record for scoring in a single game, and he broke it later in the season with a 28-point performance against Gallaudet.

Freshman forward Ronayne "Roy" Waldron was an undergraduate walk-on in an era when the varsity program centered on Georgetown University Law School students. He was called up to the varsity to play in seven games as a reserve, otherwise playing on the Collegians, an undergraduate team that played against local teams in the Washington, D.C., area and once beat the varsity team in an intramural game this season. He scored a total of 44 points and averaged 6.2 points per game in his seven varsity games. Over the next three seasons, he would become one of the top offensive producers of the early years of Georgetown basketball.

The team's 13-win total was the highest in Georgetown men's basketball history. It would not be equalled until the 1919–20 team finished at 13–1, and it would not be exceeded until the 1940–41 team won 16 games.

Joyce retired from coaching at the end of the season, having posted an overall record of 34–22 during his four seasons as head coach. He had introduced the new sport of basketball to the Washington, D.C., area in 1892, introduced basketball to Georgetown in 1906, and founded the Georgetown men's basketball program for its first season in 1906–07. He had become the Hoyas' first head coach in the 1907–08 season, the year which saw Georgetown's first great team win the mythical "Champions of the South" title.

== Roster ==
Georgetown players did not wear numbers on their jerseys this season. The first numbered jerseys in Georgetown men's basketball history would not appear until the 1933–34 season.

Name	Height	Weight (lbs.)	Position	Class	Hometown	Previous Team(s)
John Bariscillo	N/A	N/A	F	Jr.	Asbury Park, NJ, and Washington, DC, U.S.	Georgetown Preparatory School (North Bethesda, MD)
Billy Cogan	N/A	N/A	G	Grad. Stud.	Washington, DC, U.S.	Georgetown Preparatory School (North Bethesda, MD)
Lemoyne Graham	N/A	N/A	F	So.	N/A	N/A
Ed Heiskell	N/A	N/A	G	Fr.	Washington, DC, U.S.	N/A
Gus King	N/A	N/A	F	N/A	N/A	N/A
Dutch Lamberton	N/A	N/A	C	N/A	N/A	N/A
Bill Martin	5'8"	N/A	F	So.	Washington, DC, U.S.	Georgetown Preparatory School (North Bethesda, MD)
J. Louis Monarch	N/A	N/A	G	Jr.	Boston, MA, U.S.	Boston College HS
Frank Schlosser	N/A	N/A	C	Jr.	Washington, DC, U.S.	United States Army
Ronayne "Roy" Waldron	N/A	N/A	F	Fr.	Greensboro, PA, U.S.	N/A

== 1910–11 schedule and results ==
It was common practice at this time for colleges and universities to include non-collegiate opponents in their schedules, with the games recognized as part of their official record for the season, and the games against Baltimore City College, Baltimore Medical College, Staunton Military Academy, and the Washington YMCA all counted as part of Georgetown's won-loss record for 1910–11. It was not until 1952, after the completion of the 1951–52 season, that the National Collegiate Athletic Association (NCAA) ruled that colleges and universities could no longer count games played against non-collegiate opponents in their annual won-loss records.

Maryland State College was the future University of Maryland.

Date time, TV	Opponent	Result	Record	Site city, state
Regular Season
Sat., Dec. 3, 1910 no, no	Baltimore Medical	W 26–24 ^{3OT}	1-0	Ryan Gymnasium; Washington, DC
Thu., Dec. 8, 1910 no, no	at St. John's (N.Y.)	L 35–66	1-1	N/A; New York, NY
Fri., Dec. 10, 1910 no, no	at Columbia	L 12–49	1-2	N/A; New York, NY
Fri., Jan. 6, 1911 no, no	New York University	L 16–29	1-3	Arcade Rink; Washington, DC
Sat., Jan. 14, 1911 no, no	at Gallaudet	W 66–33	2-3	N/A; Washington, DC
Tue., Jan. 17, 1911 no, no	Catholic	W 54–19	3-3	Arcade Rink; Washington, DC
Sat., Jan. 21, 1911 no, no	at Loyola Maryland	W 34–15	4-3	Arcade Rink; Washington, DC
Wed., Jan. 25, 1911 no, no	Gallaudet	W 49–9	5-3	Arcade Rink; Washington, DC
Sat., Jan. 28, 1911 no, no	at Baltimore Medical	L 28–36	5-4	N/A; Baltimore, MD
Wed., Feb. 1, 1911 no, no	Catholic	W 51–18	6-4	Arcade Rink; Washington, DC
Fri., Feb. 3, 1911 no, no	at Virginia	L 19–38	6-5	Fayerweather Gymnasium; Charlottesville, VA
Sat., Feb. 4, 1911 no, no	at Staunton Military Academy	L 18–22	6-6	N/A; Staunton, VA
Sat., Feb. 11, 1911 no, no	at Navy	L 18–65	6-7	Dahlgren Hall; Annapolis, MD
Wed., Feb. 15, 1911 no, no	Maryland State	W 31–23	7-7	Arcade Rink; Washington, DC
Fri., Feb. 17, 1911 no, no	Virginia	W 35–23	8-7	Arcade Rink; Washington, DC
Sat., Feb. 18, 1911 no, no	at St. John's (Md.)	W 29–18	9-7	N/A; Annapolis, MD
Tue., Feb. 21, 1911 no, no	Baltimore City College	W 50–21	10-7	Arcade Rink; Washington, DC
N/A no, no	Loyola Maryland	W 23–17	11-7	Arcade Rink; Washington, DC
Wed., Mar. 8, 1911 no, no	Washington YMCA	W 24–22 ^{OT}	12-7	Arcade Rink; Washington, DC
Thu., Mar. 16, 1911 no, no	at Washington YMCA	W 24–21	13-7	YMCA Hall; Washington, DC
*Non-conference game. (#) Tournament seedings in parentheses.
