= 1910–11 University of Virginia men's basketball team =

American college basketball season

1910–11 University of Virginia men's basketball
- Conference: South Atlantic Intercollegiate Athletic Association
- Record: 10–5 (2–1 SAIAA)
- Head coach: Henry Lannigan (6th season)
- Home arena: Fayerweather Gymnasium

The 1910–11 University of Virginia men's basketball team represented the University of Virginia during the 1910–11 NCAA men's basketball season. The team was led by sixth-year head coach Henry Lannigan, and played their home games at Fayerweather Gymnasium in Charlottesville, Virginia. Now known as the Virginia Cavaliers, the team did not have an official nickname prior to 1923.

== Schedule ==
Date time, TV	Opponent	Result	Record	Site city, state
Regular season
January 6* no, no	Penn	L 11–32	0–1 (0–0)	Fayerweather Gymnasium; Charlottesville, VA
January 14* no, no	Hampden–Sydney	W 53–5	1–1 (0–0)	Fayerweather Gymnasium; Charlottesville, VA
January 21* no, no	Randolph–Macon	W 34–8	2–1 (0–0)	Fayerweather Gymnasium; Charlottesville, VA
January 25* no, no	Emory and Henry	W 20–8	3–1 (0–0)	Fayerweather Gymnasium; Charlottesville, VA
January 30* no, no	Washington and Lee	L 22–26	3–2 (0–0)	Fayerweather Gymnasium; Charlottesville, VA
February 3 no, no	Georgetown	W 38–19	4–2 (1–0)	Fayerweather Gymnasium; Charlottesville, VA
February 10* no, no	at Washington and Lee	W 24–19	5–2 (1–0)	Lexington, VA
February 11* no, no	at VMI	W 35–8	6–2 (1–0)	Lexington, VA
February 17* no, no	at Georgetown	L 23–35	6–3 (1–0)	Arcade Rink; Washington, DC
February 18 no, no	at Navy	L 10–50	6–4 (1–1)	Dahlgren Hall; Annapolis, MD
February 22* no, no	at Wake Forest	W 22–12	7–4 (1–1)	Winston-Salem, NC
February 23* no, no	at Duke	W 24–18	8–4 (1–1)	The Ark; Durham, NC
February 24 no, no	at North Carolina	W 18–15	9–4 (2–1)	Bynum Gymnasium; Chapel Hill, NC
February 25* no, no	at Guilford	L 19–20	9–5 (2–1)	Greensboro, NC
March 1* no, no	North Carolina	W 26–17	10–5 (2–1)	Fayerweather Gymnasium; Charlottesville, VA
*Non-conference game. (#) Tournament seedings in parentheses. All times are in Eastern Time.
