= 1911 NCAA Men's Basketball All-Americans =

Best American college basketball players of 1911

- Awarded for: 1910–11 NCAA men's basketball season

The 1911 College Basketball All-American team, as chosen retroactively by the Helms Athletic Foundation. The player highlighted in gold was chosen as the Helms Foundation College Basketball Player of the Year retroactively in 1944.

Player	Team
A. D. Alexander	Columbia
Dave Charters	Purdue
C. C. Clementson	Washington
Harry Hill	Navy
John Keenan	St. John's (NY)
Ted Kiendl	Columbia
Frank Lawler	Minnesota
W. M. Lee	Columbia
Walter Scoville	Wisconsin
Lewis Walton	Penn

== See also ==
- 1910–11 NCAA men's basketball season
