= 1912 College Basketball All-Southern Team =

The 1912 College Basketball All-Southern Team consisted of basketball players from the South chosen at their respective positions.

== All-Southerns ==
=== Guards ===
- Ed Carter, Atlanta A. C. (DJ)
- Alonzo Dozier, Columbus YMCA (DJ)
- Biscoe Seals, Birmingham A. C. (DJ [as sub], BS)
- Guy Wharton, Birmingham A. C. (BS)

=== Forwards ===
- Tommy Lewis, Columbus YMCA (DJ, BS)
- Harry Satterfield, Birmingham A. C. (DJ [as sub], BS [as C])
- Woodie Penny, Mobile YMCA (DJ)
- Tillou Forbes, Atlanta A. C. (BS)

=== Center ===
- Howell Peacock, Athens A. C. (DJ)
- Bud Massey, Columbus YMCA (DJ [as sub])

== Key ==
- DJ = selected by Dick Jemison.
- BS = selected by Bill Streit.
