= 1910–11 Columbus YMCA basketball team =

1910–11 Columbus YMCA men's basketball
- Record: 12–5 ( )
- Head coach: W. L. Dowd

The 1910–11 Columbus YMCA basketball team played basketball.

== Schedule ==
Date time, TV	Opponent	Result	Record	Site (attendance) city, state
December 3*	Birmingham Growlers	W 65–11	1–0	Columbus, GA
December 17*	Montgomery YMCA	W 75–17	2–0	Columbus, GA
December 29*	Georgia	W 40–7	3–0	Columbus, GA
January 6*	Mercer	W 61–9	4–0	Columbus, GA
January 13*	Auburn	W 45–15	5–0	Columbus, GA
January 20*	Mobile YMCA	L 16–22	5–1	Columbus, GA
January 22*	Central (KY)	W 46–17	6–1	Columbus, GA
February 4*	Atlanta A. C.	W 36–24	7–1	
February 10*	at Georgia	W 47–21	8–1	Athens, GA
February 11*	at Atlanta A. C.	W 49–17	9–1	Atlanta, GA
February 13*	at Central (KY)	L 38–40	9–2	Danville, KY
February 15*	at Christ's Church	L 41–43	9–3	Cincinnati, OH
February 17*	at Memphis YMCA	W 36–23	10–3	Memphis, TN
February 20*	at Birmingham A. C.	L 23–35	10–4	Birmingham, AL
February 22*	at Mobile YMCA	L 30–45	10–5	Mobile, AL
February 24*	at Birmingham YMCA	W 45–24	11–5	Birmingham, AL
March 4*	at Auburn	W 53–17	12–5	Auburn, AL
*Non-conference game. (#) Tournament seedings in parentheses.
