= Ted Kiendl =

American basketball player

Personal information
- Born: May 5, 1890 Brooklyn, New York, U.S.
- Died: July 26, 1976 (aged 86) Bronxville, New York, U.S.
- Listed weight: 215 lb (98 kg)

Career information
- College: Columbia (1907–1911)
- Position: Forward

Career highlights
- Helms national champion (1910); Helms Player of the Year (1911); 3× Helms All-American (1909–1911); 3× First-team All-EIBL (1908, 1909, 1911)

Theodore Kiendl, Jr. (May 5, 1890 – July 26, 1976) was an American college basketball player at Columbia University in the early 1900s. He played in the era before national player awards or national championships existed, but the Helms Athletic Foundation retroactively named him a three-time All-American. In 1944, the Foundation also retroactively named him its College Basketball Player of the Year for the 1910–11 season, and in February 1943 it retroactively named his Columbia team the national champions for the 1909–10 season. In Kiendl's four seasons the Lions compiled 42 wins and 16 losses. He was a team captain in his final three seasons and was also a three-time All-Eastern Interscholastic League selection (1908–09, 1911). Kiendl played the forward position and weighed 215 pounds (98 kg) by the time he was a senior in 1910–11. He also played on the school's baseball team and served as a captain for three years.

Kiendl was a member of the Sigma Nu fraternity. After completing his undergraduate schooling in 1911 he stayed at Columbia and earned his Bachelor of Laws degree from Columbia Law School in 1913. In his later life he served as a corporate lawyer in New York state. He argued the landmark case Erie Railroad Co. v. Tompkins before the United States Supreme Court in 1938.
