= F. M. Crawford =

American basketball coach

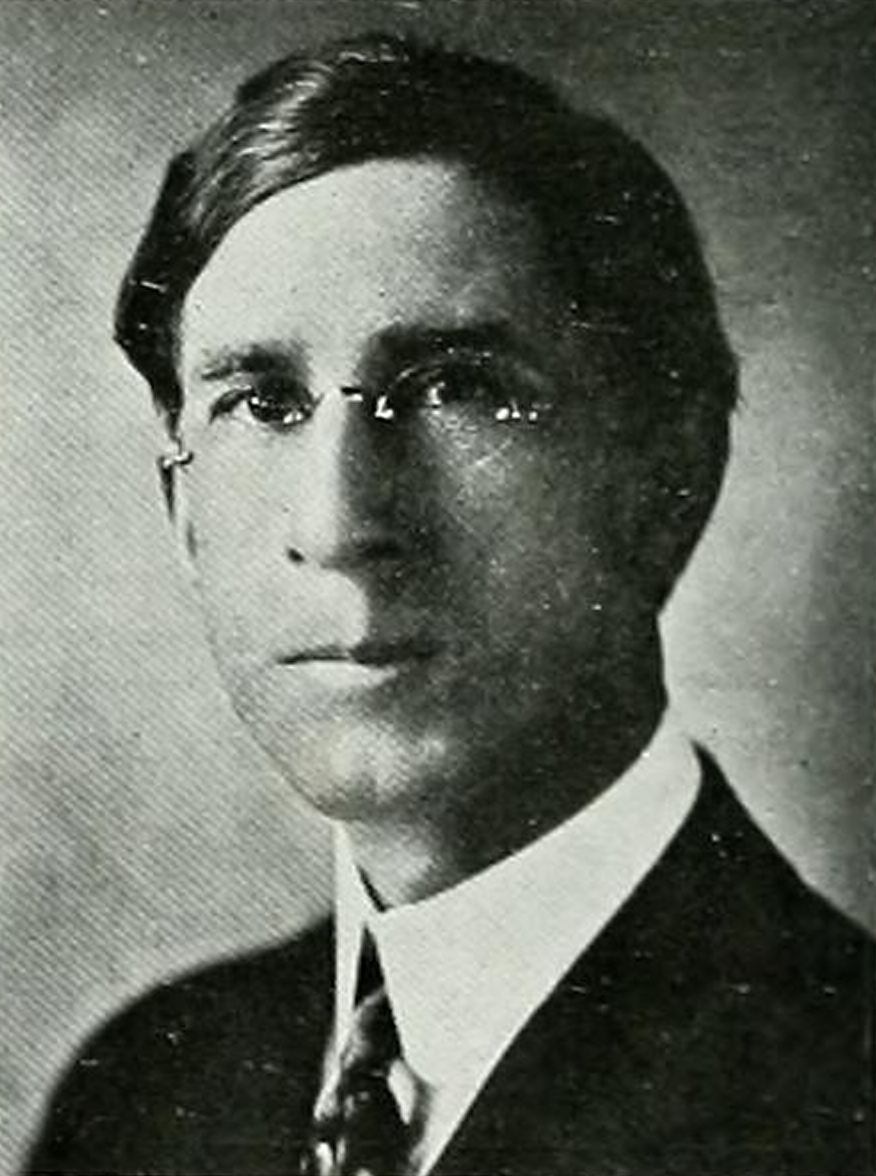
- Crawford pictured in The Colonial Echo 1917, William & Mary yearbook

Biographical details
- Born: July 8, 1883; Lee County, North Carolina, U.S.
- Died: June 12, 1953 (aged 69) near Sanford, North Carolina, U.S.
- Education: University of North Carolina at Chapel Hill; Columbia University

Coaching career (HC unless noted)
- 1907–1911: William & Mary

Administrative career (AD unless noted)
- 1907–1911: William & Mary

Head coaching record
- Overall: 12–11

Frederic Mull Crawford (July 8, 1883 – June 12, 1953) was the head coach for the William & Mary Tribe men's basketball team from 1907 to 1911. Over his four years as coach, Crawford guided the Tribe to a 12–11 record.

== Head coaching record ==
Record table
Season	Team	Overall	Conference	Standing	Postseason
William & Mary Indians (Independent) (1907–1911)
1907–08	William & Mary	1–4			
1908–09	William & Mary	7–3			
1909–10	William & Mary	1–3			
1910–11	William & Mary	3–1			
William & Mary:		12–11			
Total:		12–11			
