= Lex Stone =

American football player, sports coach, and politician (1885–1925)

Biographical details
- Born: May 19, 1885; Dellrose, Tennessee, U.S.
- Died: March 22, 1925 (aged 39); New Orleans, Louisiana, U.S.

Playing career

Football
- 1906–1907: Sewanee
- Position: Tackle

Coaching career (HC unless noted)

Football
- 1910: Tennessee

Basketball
- 1910–1911: Tennessee

Head coaching record
- Overall: 3–5–1 (football); 7–9 (basketball)

Accomplishments and honors

Awards
- All-Southern; 2nd All-Time Sewanee football team

Andrew Alexis "Lex" Stone (May 19, 1885 – March 22, 1925) was an American football player, a coach of football and basketball, and a politician.

== Sewanee ==
Stone was a prominent tackle for the Sewanee Tigers of Sewanee: The University of the South. At Sewanee he was a member of Phi Delta Theta. Stone was picked as a second-team tackle on Sewanee's All-time football team. Stone was selected for John Heisman's list of the 30 greatest Southern football players. He stood some 6'2" and 172 pounds.

=== 1907 ===
Stone was selected All-Southern in 1907. Vanderbilt coach Dan McGugin wrote "Lex Stone, of Sewanee, at left tackle was also an exceptional man. He is strong, fast, heavy and good running with the ball or stopping an opponent who has it. He, too, is a line man of a decade for a SIAA college." He was given honorable mention by Walter Camp.

== Tennessee ==
Stone served as the head football coach at the University of Tennessee for one season in 1910, compiling a record 3–5–1. He also coached the Tennessee Volunteers basketball team during the 1910–11 season, tallying a mark of 7–9. Stone also served in the Tennessee House of Representatives from 1913 to 1915.

== Head coaching record ==
=== Football ===
Year	Team	Overall	Conference	Standing	Bowl/playoffs
Tennessee Volunteers (Southern Intercollegiate Athletic Association) (1910)
1910	Tennessee	3–5–1	1–4	13th	
Tennessee:		3–5–1	1–4		
Total:		3–5–1			

=== Basketball ===
Record table
Season	Team	Overall	Conference	Standing	Postseason
Tennessee Volunteers () (1910–1911)
1910–11	Tennessee	7–9			
Tennessee:		7–9 (.438)			
Total:		7–9 (.438)			
