= 1910–11 Central University men's basketball team =

American college basketball season

1910–11 Centre Colonels men's basketball

SIAA champion
- Conference: Southern Intercollegiate Athletic Association
- Record: 9–4 (2–0 SIAA)
- Head coach: M. B. Banks
- Captain: William Seelbach

The 1910–11 Central University men's basketball team represented Centre College during the 1910–11 college basketball season. The team was led by brothers William and Louis Seelbach, the sons of the man who founded the Seelbach Hotel. The team posted a 9–4 record. The highlight of the season was the defeat of Columbus YMCA, 40–38.
