= Tillou Forbes =

Basketball player from Atlanta

Personal information
- Born: August 16, 1890

Career information
- College: Georgia

Career history
- 1909-1911: Georgia
- 1912-1914: Atlanta Athletic Club

Career highlights
- All-Southern (1911, 1912); SIAA Champion (1909); Southern Champion (1914)

Tillou H. Forbes (August 16, 1890 – May 23, 1963) was a basketball player from Atlanta for the University of Georgia. He later worked as a floor covering contractor. He played forward and was chosen captain of the 1911 team. He was chosen All-Southern in 1911. He played for the Atlanta Athletic Club and was chosen All-Southern in 1912.
