= Claude Allen (athlete) =

American athlete

Claude Arthur Allen (April 29, 1885, in Olean, New York – January 18, 1979, in Roselle, New Jersey) was an American track and field athlete who competed in the 1904 Summer Olympics and a college basketball head coach. In 1904, Allen placed fifth in the pole vault competition.

Allen coached the Niagara basketball team for the 1909–10 season and the St. John's basketball team for the 1910–11 season. Allen's St. John's team finished the season with a 14–0 record and was retroactively named the national champion by the Helms Athletic Foundation. In addition, this team was retroactively listed as the top team of the season by the Premo-Porretta Power Poll.

In his college years, he attended and competed for Syracuse University.
