= Jim Flanagan =

Irish hurler

John Connolly
Personal information
- Native name: Séamus Ó Flannagáin (Irish)
- Born: 10 April 1870 Tubberadora, County Tipperary, Ireland
- Died: 24 September 1933 (aged 63) Tubberadora, County Tipperary, Ireland
- Occupation: Blacksmith

Sport
- Sport: Hurling
Club
- Years: Club
- Tubberadora
Inter-county
- Years: County
- 1895-1896: Tipperary
Inter-county titles
- Munster titles: 2
- All-Irelands: 2

James Flanagan (10 April 1870 – 24 September 1933) was an Irish sportsperson. He played hurling with his local club Tubberadora and was a member of the Tipperary senior hurling team between 1895 and 1898.

== Honours ==
Tipperary

- All-Ireland Senior Hurling Championship (2): 1895, 1896
- Munster Senior Hurling Championship (2): 1895, 1896
