= 1910–11 Army Cadets men's basketball team =

American college basketball season

1910–11 Army Cadets men's basketball
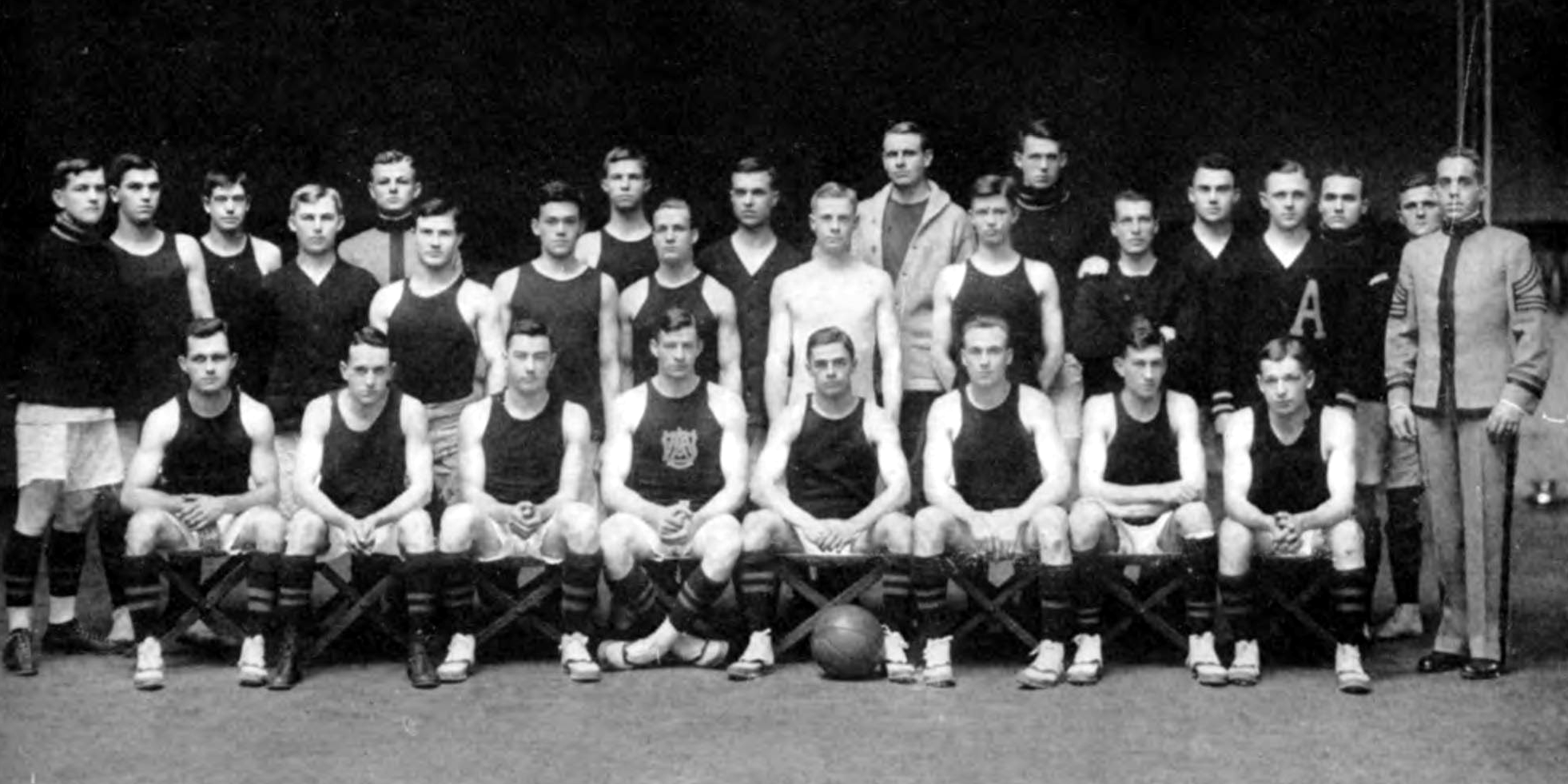
- Conference: Independent
- Record: 9–3
- Head coach: Joseph Stilwell (6th season)
- Captain: Carl McKinney

The 1910–11 Army Cadets men's basketball team represented United States Military Academy during the 1910–11 college men's basketball season. The head coach was Joseph Stilwell, coaching his sixth season with the Cadets. The team captain was Carl McKinney.

== Schedule ==
Date time, TV	Opponent	Result	Record	Site city, state
	Manhattan	W 36–18	1–0	West Point, NY
	Trinity	W 29–16	2–0	West Point, NY
12/17/1910	Penn State	W 31–19	3–0	West Point, NY
	Union	L 12–13	3–1	West Point, NY
	Princeton	W 34–14	4–1	West Point, NY
	Swarthmore	L 27–30	4–2	West Point, NY
	Yale	W 23–21	5–2	West Point, NY
	Pennsylvania	L 16–18	5–3	West Point, NY
	Colgate	W 31–11	6–3	West Point, NY
	Rochester	W 22–20	7–3	West Point, NY
	Dickinson	W 35–24	8–3	West Point, NY
	New York University	W 31–14	9–3	West Point, NY
*Non-conference game. (#) Tournament seedings in parentheses.
