= 1910–11 Tennessee Volunteers basketball team =

American college basketball season

1910–11 Tennessee Volunteers men's basketball
- Conference: Independent
- Record: 7–9
- Head coach: Lex Stone (1st season)
- Captain: Earl F. Ketchen
- Home arena: none

The 1910–11 Tennessee Volunteers basketball team represented the University of Tennessee during the 1910–11 college men's basketball season. The head coach was Lex Stone, coaching the team his first season. The Volunteers team captain was Earl F. Ketchen.

== Schedule ==
Date time, TV	Opponent	Result	Record	Site city, state
January 11, 1911*	TSD	L 30–42	0–1	Knoxville, TN
January 14, 1911*	at Maryville	W 36–28	1–1	Maryville, TN
January 17, 1911*	Knoxville YMCA	W 46–41	2–1	Knoxville, TN
January 20, 1911*	Knoxville YMCA	L 22–36	2–2	Knoxville, TN
February 10, 1911*	Knoxville YMCA	W 34–30	3–2	Knoxville, TN
February 11, 1911*	Maryville	W 41–24	4–2	Knoxville, TN
February 13, 1911*	at Tusculum	W 45–26	5–2	Greeneville, TN
February 14, 1911*	at Emory & Henry	W 38–34	6–2	Bristol, TN
February 15, 1909*	at Virginia Tech	L 20–58	6–3	Blacksburg, VA
February 17, 1911*	at Washington and Lee	L 22–76	6–4	Lexington, VA
February 18, 1911*	at VMI	L 19–21	6–5	Lexington, VA
February 20, 1911*	at Duke	L 25–48	6–6	The Ark; Durham, NC
February 21, 1911*	at North Carolina	L 21–40	6–7	Chapel Hill, NC
February 22, 1911*	at Guilford College	L 39–46	6–8	Greensboro, NC
February 25, 1911*	at Mooney School	L 13–43	6–9	Harriman, TN
February 27, 1911*	at Maryville	W 33–29	7–9	Maryville, TN
*Non-conference game. (#) Tournament seedings in parentheses.
