= 1910–11 Auburn Tigers men's basketball team =

American college basketball season

1910–11 Auburn Tigers men's basketball
- Conference: Southern Intercollegiate Athletic Association
- Record: 3–5 (0–1 SIAA)
- Head coach: Mike Donahue (6th season)
- Captain: L.A. Scarbrough
- Home arena: The Gymnasium

The 1910–11 Auburn Tigers men's basketball team represented Auburn University during the 1910–11 college basketball season. The head coach was Mike Donahue, coaching his sixth season with the Tigers.

== Schedule ==
Date time, TV	Opponent	Result	Record	Site city, state
*	Columbus YMCA	L 33–45	0–1	
	at Georgia	L 24–26	0–2	Founders Hall; Atlanta, GA
*	Birmingham Athletic Club	L 19–53	0–3	
January 18, 1909*	Bessemer Athletic Club	W 29–24	1–3	
*	Birmingham H.S.	L 21–28	1–4	
*	Birmingham YMCA	L 27–30	1–5	
February 11, 1911*	Texas	W 45–27	2–5	
*	Nashville Athletic Club	W 36–34	3–5	
*Non-conference game. (#) Tournament seedings in parentheses.
