= 1910–11 St. John's Redmen basketball team =

American college basketball season

1910–11 St. John's Redmen men's basketball
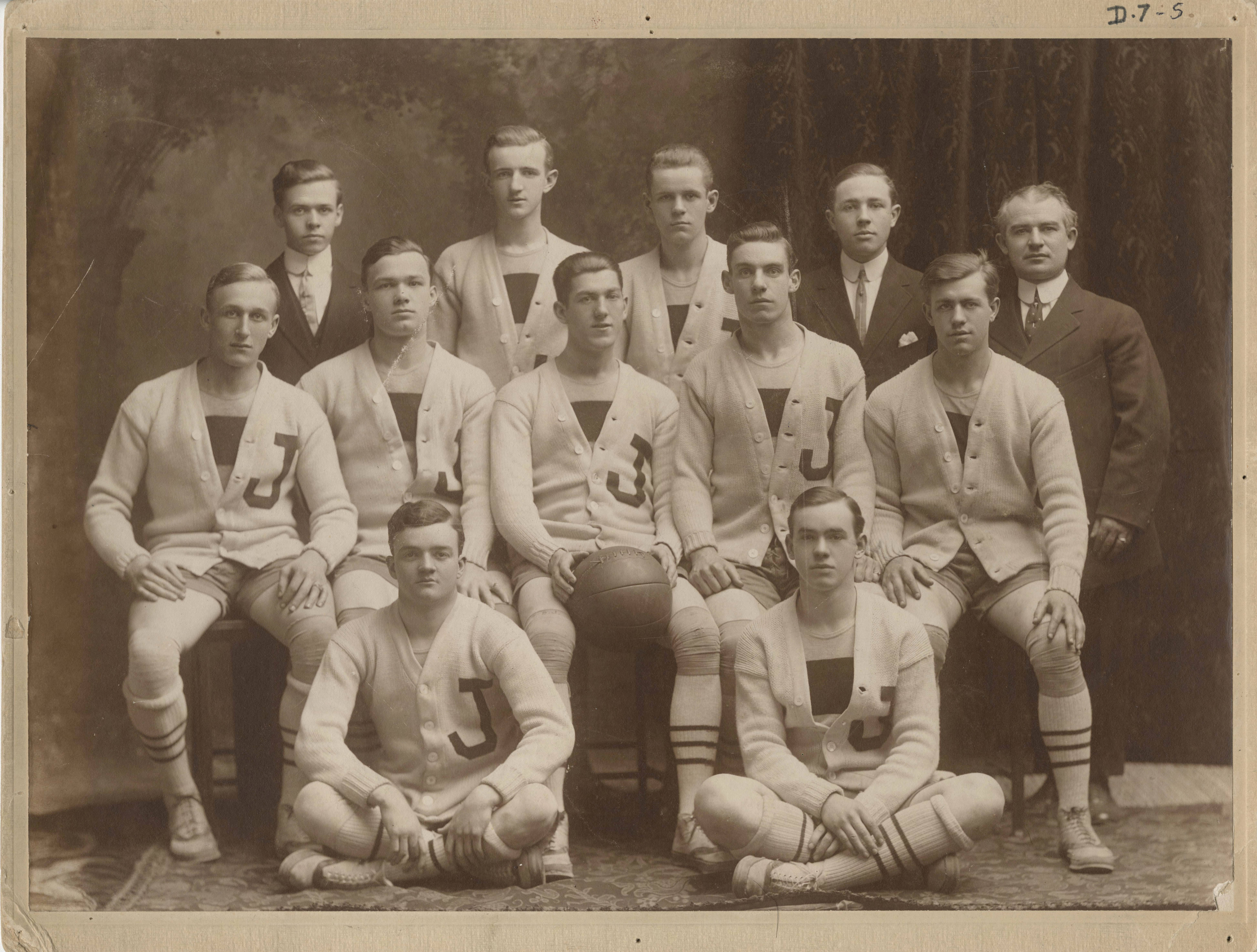

Helms Foundation National Champion
- Conference: Independent
- Record: 14–0
- Head coach: Claude Allen (1st season)
- Captain: Thomas Tracey

The 1910–11 St. John's Redmen basketball team represented St. John's University during the 1910–11 intercollegiate basketball season in the United States. The head coach was Claude Allen, coaching in his first season with the Redmen. The team finished the season with a 14–0 record and claimed the national intercollegiate championship. The team was also later retroactively named the national champion by the Helms Athletic Foundation and was retroactively listed as the top team of the season by the Premo-Porretta Power Poll.

== Schedule and results ==
Date time, TV	Rank^{#}	Opponent^{#}	Result	Record	Site city, state
Regular season
11/26/1910*		Cathedral	W 65–11	1–0	Queens, NY
12/8/1910*		Georgetown	W 66–35	2–0	Queens, NY
12/10/1910*		at Penn	W 25–23	3–0	Philadelphia, PA
12/14/1910*		St. Lawrence	W 49–33	4–0	Queens, NY
12/31/1910*		Wesleyan	W 44–31	5–0	Queens, NY
1/3/1911*		vs. Yale	W 31–20	6–0	2nd Ave. Armory; New York, NY
1/7/1911*		Niagara	W 29–17	7–0	Queens, NY
1/12/1911*		Carlisle	W 44–17	8–0	Queens, NY
1/21/1911*		Alumni	W 44–19	9–0	Queens, NY
2/2/1911*		Tufts	W 48–24	10–0	Queens, NY
2/4/1911*		RPI	W 52–14	11–0	Queens, NY
2/11/1911*		Trinity	W 48–21	12–0	Queens, NY
2/13/1911*		Colgate	W 31–20	13–0	Queens, NY
2/17/1911*		Rochester	W 32–27	14–0	Queens, NY
*Non-conference game. ^{#}Rankings from AP Poll. (#) Tournament seedings in parentheses.
