= 1910–11 Cincinnati Bearcats men's basketball team =

American college basketball season

1910–11 Cincinnati Bearcats men's basketball
- Conference: Ohio Athletic Conference
- Record: 3–6 (1–2 OAC)
- Head coach: Russell Easton (1st season)
- Captain: John Stewart
- Home arena: Schmidlapp Gymnasium

The 1910–11 Cincinnati Bearcats men's basketball team represented the University of Cincinnati during the 1910–11 college men's basketball season. The head coach was Russell Easton, coaching his first season with the Bearcats.

== Schedule ==
Date time, TV	Opponent	Result	Record	Site city, state
January 13	Earlham	L 15–36	0–1	Schmidlapp Gymnasium; Cincinnati, OH
January 18	Antioch	L 20–41	0–2	Schmidlapp Gymnasium; Cincinnati, OH
February 2	at Antioch	W 27–13	1–2	Granville, OH
February 10	at Dayton	L 19–48	1–3	Dayton, OH
February 21	Butler	W 15–11	2–3	Schmidlapp Gymnasium; Cincinnati, OH
February 25	at Miami (OH)	L 15–28	2–4	Oxford, OH
March 5	Denison	L 11–22	2–5	Schmidlapp Gymnasium; Cincinnati, OH
March 7	at Lebanon (OH)	L 27–29	2–6	
March 10	Miami (OH)	W 17–16	3–6	Schmidlapp Gymnasium; Cincinnati, OH
*Non-conference game. (#) Tournament seedings in parentheses.
