= 1910–11 Georgia Bulldogs basketball team =

American college basketball season

1910–11 Georgia Bulldogs basketball
- Conference: Southern Intercollegiate Athletic Association
- Record: 2–5 (1–2 SIAA)
- Head coach: W. A. Cunningham (1st season)
- Captain: Tillou Forbes
- Home arena: Founders Hall

The 1910–11 Georgia Bulldogs basketball team represented the University of Georgia as a member of the Southern Intercollegiate Athletic Association (SIAA) during the 1910–11 NCAA men's basketball season. Led by first-year head coach W. A. Cunningham, the Bulldogs compiled an overall record of 2–5 with a mark of 1–2 in conference play. The team captain was Tillou Forbes.

== Schedule ==
Date time, TV	Opponent	Result	Record	Site city, state
*	Fifth Regiment	W 43–33	1–0	Founders Hall; Atlanta, GA
*	Columbus YMCA	L 11–40	1–1	Columbus, GA
*	Mercer	L 26–28	1–2	Founders Hall; Atlanta, GA
*	Auburn	W 26–24	2–2	Founders Hall; Atlanta, GA
*	at A.A.C.	L 22–27	2–3	
*	Mercer	L 24–27	2–4	Founders Hall; Atlanta, GA
*	Columbus YMCA	L 21–47	2–5	Founders Hall; Atlanta, GA
*Non-conference game. (#) Tournament seedings in parentheses.
