= 1910–11 William & Mary Indians men's basketball team =

American college basketball season

1910–11 William & Mary Indians men's basketball
- Conference: Independent
- Record: 3–1
- Head coach: F. M. Crawford (4th season)

The 1910–11 William & Mary Indians men's basketball team represented the College of William & Mary in intercollegiate basketball during the 1910–11 season. The team finished the season with a 3–1 record. This was the sixth season in program history for William & Mary, whose nickname is now "Tribe."

== Schedule ==
Date time, TV	Rank^{#}	Opponent^{#}	Result	Record	Site city, state
Regular season
*		Randolph–Macon	W 25–16	1–0	Williamsburg, VA
*		Randolph–Macon	L 14–16	1–1	Williamsburg, VA
*		Hampden–Sydney	W 24–20	2–1	Williamsburg, VA
*		Hampden–Sydney	W 41–13	3–1	Williamsburg, VA
*Non-conference game. ^{#}Rankings from AP Poll. (#) Tournament seedings in parentheses.
