= 1910–11 Ohio Bobcats men's basketball team =

American college basketball season

1910–11 Ohio Bobcats men's basketball
- Conference: Independent
- Record: 3–4
- Head coach: John J. Corbett (1st season)
- Home arena: Ohio Gymnasium

The 1910–11 Ohio Bobcats basketball team represented Ohio University. John J. Corbett was the head coach for Ohio. The Bobcats played their home games in Ohio Gymnasium.

== Schedule ==
Date time, TV	Rank^{#}	Opponent^{#}	Result	Record	Site (attendance) city, state
Regular Season
*		Muskingum	W 28–21	1–0	Ohio Gymnasium; Athens, OH
*		at Ohio Wesleyan	L 18–67	1–1	Edwards Gymnasium; Delaware, OH
*		Carnegie Tech	L 23–26	1–2	Ohio Gymnasium; Athens, OH
*		Denison	L 5–18	1–3	Ohio Gymnasium; Athens, OH
*		Wittenberg	W 40–12	2–3	Ohio Gymnasium; Athens, OH
*		St. Lawrence	L 15–18	2–4	Ohio Gymnasium; Athens, OH
*		Marietta	W 15–12	3–4	Ohio Gymnasium; Athens, OH
*Non-conference game. ^{#}Rankings from AP Poll. (#) Tournament seedings in parentheses. All times are in Eastern Time.
