= 1910–11 New Mexico Lobos men's basketball team =

American college basketball season

1910–11 New Mexico Lobos men's basketball
- Conference: Independent
- Record: 4–1
- Head coach: Ralph Hutchinson (1st season)

The 1910–11 New Mexico Lobos men's basketball team represented the University of New Mexico during the 1910–11 NCAA college men's basketball season. The head coach was Ralph Hutchinson, coaching his first season with the Lobos.

== Schedule ==
Date time, TV	Opponent	Result	Record	Site city, state
Jan 6, 1911	New Mexico Highlands	W 21–19	1–0	Albuquerque, New Mexico
Jan 13, 1911	Albuquerque High School	W 34–12	2–0	Albuquerque, New Mexico
Jan 27, 1911	New Mexico State; Rivalry	W 15–09	3–0	Albuquerque, New Mexico
Feb 3, 1911	at New Mexico State; Rivalry	W 18–10	4–0	Las Cruces, New Mexico
Feb 10, 1911	New Mexico Highlands	L 11–26	4–1	Albuquerque, New Mexico
*Non-conference game. (#) Tournament seedings in parentheses.
