= 1910–11 Connecticut Aggies men's basketball team =

American college basketball season

1910–11 Connecticut Aggies men's basketball
- Conference: Athletic League of New England State Colleges
- Record: 1–2 (0–0 ALNESC)

The 1910–11 Connecticut Aggies men's basketball team represented Connecticut Agricultural College, now the University of Connecticut, in the 1910–11 collegiate men's basketball season. The Aggies did not play any games during the 1908–09 or 1909–10 seasons. The Aggies completed the season with a 1–2 overall record. The Aggies were members of the Athletic League of New England State Colleges.

== Schedule ==
Date time, TV	Rank^{#}	Opponent^{#}	Result	Record	Site (attendance) city, state
Regular Season
*		Cyclers	L 24–35	0–1	
*		Monson Academy	L 40–48	0–2	
*		Cyclers	W 18–15	1–2	
*Non-conference game. ^{#}Rankings from AP Poll. (#) Tournament seedings in parentheses. All times are in Eastern Time.

Schedule Source:
