= 1910–11 Navy Midshipmen men's basketball team =

American college basketball season

1910–11 Navy Midshipmen men's basketball

Southern champion
- Conference: Independent
- Record: 10–1
- Head coach: Bernard Willis (1st season)
- Home arena: Dahlgren Hall

The 1910–11 Navy Midshipmen men's basketball team represented the United States Naval Academy in intercollegiate basketball during the 1910–11 season. The head coach was Bernard Willis, coaching his first season with the Midshipmen.

== Schedule ==
Date time, TV	Opponent	Result	Record	Site city, state
Dec. 10, 1910* no, no	Baltimore Med. College	W 39–18	1–0	Dahlgren Hall; Annapolis, MD
*	at Loyola	W 49–11	2–0	Baltimore, MD
Dec. 31, 1910* no	Gettysburg	W 73–13	3–0	Dahlengren Hall; Annapolis, MD
Jan. 7, 1911 no, no	New York U.	L 24–26	3–1	Dahlgren Hall; Annapolis, MD
Jan. 11, 1911 no, no	St. John's MD.	W 49–16	4–1	Dahlgren Hall; Annapolis, MD
Jan. 14, 1911 no, no	at Penn	W 32–23	5–1	Philadelphia, PA
Jan. 21, 1911 no, no	Lehigh	W 31–24	6–1	Dahlgren Hall; Annapolis, MD
Feb. 1, 1911 no, no	Washington & Lee	W 60–25	7–1	Dahlgren Hall; Annapolis, MD
Feb. 4, 1911 no, no	Swarthmore	W 34–28	8–1	Dahlgren Hall; Annapolis, MD
Feb. 11, 1911 no, no	Georgetown	W 65–18	9–1	Dahlgren Hall; Annapolis, MD
Feb. 18, 1911 no, no	Virginia	W 50–10	10–1	Dahlgren Hall; Annapolis, MD
*Non-conference game. (#) Tournament seedings in parentheses.
