= 1910–11 Penn State Nittany Lions basketball team =

American college basketball season

1910–11 Penn State Nittany Lions men's basketball
- Conference: Independent
- Record: 9–4
- Head coach: student coaches
- Captain: F.H. Blythe
- Home arena: Armory

The 1910–11 Penn State Nittany Lions basketball team represented Penn State University during the 1910–11 college men's basketball season. The team finished with a final record of 9–4.

== Schedule ==
| Date time, TV | Opponent | Result | Record | Site city, state |
|---|---|---|---|---|
| 12/09/1910* | Susquehanna | W 44–13 | 1–0 | Armory; University Park, PA |
| 12/14/1910* | at Pennsylvania | L 22–30 | 1–1 | Philadelphia, PA |
| 12/15/1910* | at Pratt Institute | W 37–18 | 2–1 | Brooklyn, NY |
| 12/16/1910* | at Columbia | L 16–24 | 2–2 | New York, NY |
| 12/17/1909* | at Army | L 19–24 | 2–3 | West Point, NY |
| 1/16/1911* | Pittsburgh Collegians | W 19–14 | 3–3 | Armory; University Park, PA |
| 2/03/1911* | Albright | W 50–9 | 4–3 | Armory; University Park, PA |
| 2/09/1911* | Gettysburg | W 14–10 | 5–3 | Armory; University Park, PA |
| 2/16/1911* | at Swarthmore | L 25–37 | 5–4 | Swarthmore, PA |
| 2/17/1911* | at Susquehanna | W 35–21 | 6–4 | |
| 2/19/1911* | at Bucknell | W 26–10 | 7–4 | Lewisburg, PA |
| 2/22/1911* | Lehigh | W 34–13 | 8–4 | Armory; University Park, PA |
| 2/24/1911* | Bucknell | W 34–16 | 9–4 | Armory; University Park, PA |
*Non-conference game. (#) Tournament seedings in parentheses.
