= 1910–11 VMI Keydets basketball team =

American college basketball season

1910–11 VMI Keydets men's basketball
- Conference: Independent
- Record: 2–6
- Head coach: J. Mitchell (1st season)
- Home arena: Lexington Skating Rink

The 1910–11 VMI Keydets basketball team represented the Virginia Military Institute in their third ever season of basketball. The Keydets went 3–5, coached by J. Mitchell. They played their games out of the Lexington Skating Rink.

== Schedule ==
Date time, TV	Opponent	Result	Record	Site city, state
January 14* no, no	Roanoke	W 20–8	1–0	Lexington Skating Rink; Lexington, VA
January 21* no, no	St. John's	W 34–12	1–1	Lexington Skating Rink; Lexington, VA
January 28* no, no	Maryland	W 17–14	1–2	Lexington Skating Rink; Lexington, VA
February 11* no, no	Virginia	W 35–8	1–3	Lexington Skating Rink; Lexington, VA
February 18* no, no	Tennessee	W 21–19	2–3	Lexington Skating Rink; Lexington, VA
February 25* no, no	Virginia Tech	W 35–18	2–4	Lexington Skating Rink; Lexington, VA
March 7* no, no	at Lynchburg YMCA	W 41–23	2–5	Unknown; Lynchburg, VA
March 9* no, no	at Duke	W 52–17	2–6	Unknown; Durham, NC
*Non-conference game. (#) Tournament seedings in parentheses.

== See also ==
- VMI Keydets
- VMI Keydets men's basketball
