= List of Indiana Hoosiers men's basketball seasons =

This is a list of the seasons completed by the Indiana Hoosiers men's basketball team. The Hoosiers have an overall record of 1,950–1,130. They have appeared in the AP Poll 580 times, which is eighth all time.

== Seasons ==
Record table
Season	Coach	Overall	Conference	Standing	Postseason
James Horne (Independent) (1900–1901)
1900–01	James Horne	1–4^{[Note A]}			
Phelps Darby (Independent) (1902)
1901–02	Phelps Darby	4–4			
Willis Koval (Independent) (1902–1904)
1902–03	Willis Koval	8–4			
1903–04	Willis Koval	5–4			
Zora Clevenger (Big Ten Conference) (1904–1906)
1904–05	Zora Clevenger	5–12	1–1		
1905–06	Zora Clevenger	7–9	2–2	3rd	
James M. Sheldon (Big Ten Conference) (1906–1907)
1906–07	James M. Sheldon	9–5	0–0		
Ed Cook (Big Ten Conference) (1907–1908)
1907–08	Ed Cook	9–6	2–4	4th	
Robert Harris (Big Ten Conference) (1908–1909)
1908–09	Robert Harris	5–9	2–6	6th	
John Georgen (Big Ten Conference) (1909–1910)
1909–10	John Georgen	5–8	3–7	7th	
Oscar Rackle (Big Ten Conference) (1910–1911)
1910–11	Oscar Rackle	11–5	5–5	6th	
James Kase (Big Ten Conference) (1911–1912)
1911–12	James Kase	6–11	2–9	6th	
Art Powell (Big Ten Conference) (1912–1913)
1912–13	Art Powell	5–11	0–10	9th	
Arthur Berndt (Big Ten Conference) (1913–1915)
1913–14	Arthur Berndt	2–12	1–11	9th	
1914–15	Arthur Berndt	4–9	1–9	9th	
Allan Williford (Big Ten Conference) (1915–1916)
1915–16	Allan Williford	6–7	3–5	5th	
Guy Lowman (Big Ten Conference) (1916–1917)
1916–17	Guy Lowman	13–6	3–5	5th	
Dana Evans (Big Ten Conference) (1917–1919)
1917–18	Dana Evans	10–4	3–3	8th	
1918–19	Dana Evans	10–7	4–6	6th	
Ewald O. Stiehm (Big Ten Conference) (1919–1920)
1919–20	Ewald O. Stiehm	13–8	6–4	4th	
George Levis (Big Ten Conference) (1920–1922)
1920–21	George Levis	15–6	6–5	6th	
1921–22	George Levis	10–10	3–7	9th	
Leslie Mann (Big Ten Conference) (1922–1924)
1922–23	Leslie Mann	8–7	5–7	7th	
1923–24	Leslie Mann	11–6	7–5	T–6th	
Everett Dean (Big Ten Conference) (1924–1938)
1924–25	Everett Dean	12–5	8–4	2nd	
1925–26	Everett Dean	12–5	8–4	T–1st	
1926–27	Everett Dean	13–4	9–3	T–2nd	
1927–28	Everett Dean	15–2	10–2	T–1st	
1928–29	Everett Dean	7–10	4–8	8th	
1929–30	Everett Dean	8–9	7–5	T–3rd	
1930–31	Everett Dean	9–8	5–7	6th	
1931–32	Everett Dean	8–10	4–8	7th	
1932–33	Everett Dean	10–8	6–6	T–5th	
1933–34	Everett Dean	13–7	6–6	T–5th	
1934–35	Everett Dean	14–6	8–4	T–4th	
1935–36	Everett Dean	18–2	11–1	T–1st	
1936–37	Everett Dean	13–7	6–6	6th	
1937–38	Everett Dean	10–10	4–8	T–8th	
Branch McCracken (Big Ten Conference) (1938–1943)
1938–39	Branch McCracken	18-2	10-2	1st	
1939–40	Branch McCracken	20–3	9–3	2nd	NCAA Champion
1940–41	Branch McCracken	17–3	10–2	2nd	
1941–42	Branch McCracken	15–6	10–5	T–2nd	
1942–43	Branch McCracken	18–2	11–2	2nd	
Harry C. Good (Big Ten Conference) (1943–1946)
1943–44	Harry C. Good	7–15	2–10	T–8th	
1944–45	Harry C. Good	10–11	3–9	9th	
1945–46	Harry C. Good	18–3	9–3	2nd	
Branch McCracken (Big Ten Conference) (1946–1965)
1946–47	Branch McCracken	12–8	8–4	T–2nd	
1947–48	Branch McCracken	8–12	3–9	T–8th	
1948–49	Branch McCracken	14–8	6–6	T–4th	
1949–50	Branch McCracken	17–5	7–5	T–3rd	
1950–51	Branch McCracken	19–3	12–2	2nd	
1951–52	Branch McCracken	16–6	9–5	4th	
1952–53	Branch McCracken	23–3	17–1	1st	NCAA Champion
1953–54	Branch McCracken	20–4	12–2	1st	NCAA Sweet Sixteen
1954–55	Branch McCracken	8–14	5–9	T–6th	
1955–56	Branch McCracken	13–9	6–8	T–6th	
1956–57	Branch McCracken	14–8	10–4	T–1st	
1957–58	Branch McCracken	13–11	10–4	1st	NCAA University Division Sweet Sixteen
1958–59	Branch McCracken	11–11	7–7	T–5th	
1959–60	Branch McCracken	20–4	11–3	2nd	
1960–61	Branch McCracken	15–9	8–6	T–4th	
1961–62	Branch McCracken	14–9	7–7	T–4th	
1962–63	Branch McCracken	13–11	9–5	3rd	
1963–64	Branch McCracken	9–15	5–9	8th	
1964–65	Branch McCracken	19–5	9–5	4th	
Lou Watson (Big Ten Conference) (1965–1969)
1965–66	Lou Watson	8–16	4–10	T–9th	
1966–67	Lou Watson	18–8	10–4	T–1st	NCAA University Division Sweet Sixteen
1967–68	Lou Watson	10–14	4–10	T–9th	
1968–69	Lou Watson	9–15	4–10	10th	
Jerry Oliver (Big Ten Conference) (1969–1970)
1969–70	Jerry Oliver	7–17	3–11	10th	
Lou Watson (Big Ten Conference) (1970–1971)
1970–71	Lou Watson	17–7	9–5	4th	
Bob Knight (Big Ten Conference) (1971–2000)
1971–72	Bob Knight	17–8	9–5	T–3rd	NIT first round
1972–73	Bob Knight	22–6	11–3	1st	NCAA University Division Final Four
1973–74	Bob Knight	23–5	12–2	T–1st	CCAT Champion
1974–75	Bob Knight	31–1	18–0	1st	NCAA Division I Elite Eight
1975–76	Bob Knight	32–0	18–0	1st	NCAA Division I Champion
1976–77	Bob Knight	16–11	11–7	5th	
1977–78	Bob Knight	21–8	12–6	2nd	NCAA Division I Sweet Sixteen
1978–79	Bob Knight	22–12	10–8	5th	NIT Champion
1979–80	Bob Knight	21–8	13–5	1st	NCAA Division I Sweet Sixteen
1980–81	Bob Knight	26–9	14–4	1st	NCAA Division I Champion
1981–82	Bob Knight	19–10	12–6	T–2nd	NCAA Division I second round
1982–83	Bob Knight	24–6	13–5	1st	NCAA Division I Sweet Sixteen
1983–84	Bob Knight	22–9	13–5	3rd	NCAA Division I Elite Eight
1984–85	Bob Knight	19–14	7–11	7th	NIT Runner-up
1985–86	Bob Knight	21–8	13–5	2nd	NCAA Division I first round
1986–87	Bob Knight	30–4	15–3	T–1st	NCAA Division I Champion
1987–88	Bob Knight	19–10	11–7	5th	NCAA Division I first round
1988–89	Bob Knight	27–8	15–3	1st	NCAA Division I Sweet Sixteen
1989–90	Bob Knight	18–11	8–10	7th	NCAA Division I first round
1990–91	Bob Knight	29–5	15–3	T–1st	NCAA Division I Sweet Sixteen
1991–92	Bob Knight	27–7	14–4	2nd	NCAA Division I Final Four
1992–93	Bob Knight	31–4	17–1	1st	NCAA Division I Elite Eight
1993–94	Bob Knight	21–9	12–6	3rd	NCAA Division I Sweet Sixteen
1994–95	Bob Knight	19–12	11–7	T–3rd	NCAA Division I first round
1995–96	Bob Knight	19–12	13–5	T–2nd	NCAA Division I first round
1996–97	Bob Knight	22–11	9–9	T–6th	NCAA Division I first round
1997–98	Bob Knight	20–12	9–7	T–5th	NCAA Division I second round
1998–99	Bob Knight	23–11	9–7	T–3rd	NCAA Division I second round
1999–00	Bob Knight	20–9	10–6	5th	NCAA Division I first round
Mike Davis (Big Ten Conference) (2000–2006)
2000–01	Mike Davis	21–13	10–6	4th	NCAA Division I first round
2001–02	Mike Davis	25–12	11–5	T–1st	NCAA Division I Runner-up
2002–03	Mike Davis	21–13	8–8	6th	NCAA Division I second round
2003–04	Mike Davis	14–15	7–9	T–9th	
2004–05	Mike Davis	15–14	10–6	T–4th	NIT first round
2005–06	Mike Davis	19–12	9–7	T–4th	NCAA Division I second round
Kelvin Sampson (Big Ten Conference) (2006–2008)
2006–07	Kelvin Sampson	21–11	10–6	3rd	NCAA Division I second round
2007–08	Kelvin Sampson; Dan Dakich	25–8^{[Note B]}	14–4	3rd	NCAA Division I first round
Tom Crean (Big Ten Conference) (2008–2017)
2008–09	Tom Crean	6–25	1–17	11th	
2009–10	Tom Crean	10–21	4–14	T–9th	
2010–11	Tom Crean	12–20	3–15	11th	
2011–12	Tom Crean	27–9	11–7	5th	NCAA Division I Sweet Sixteen
2012–13	Tom Crean	29–7	14–4	1st	NCAA Division I Sweet Sixteen
2013–14	Tom Crean	17–15	7–11	T–8th	
2014–15	Tom Crean	20–14	9–9	T–7th	NCAA Division I second round
2015–16	Tom Crean	27–8	15–3	1st	NCAA Division I Sweet Sixteen
2016–17	Tom Crean	18–16	7–11	T–10th	NIT first round
Archie Miller (Big Ten Conference) (2017–2021)
2017–18	Archie Miller	16–15	9–9	T–6th	
2018–19	Archie Miller	19–16	8–12	9th	NIT Quarterfinal
2019–20	Archie Miller	20–12	9–11	T–10th	No postseason held
2020–21	Archie Miller	12–15	7–12	T–10th	
Mike Woodson (Big Ten Conference) (2021–2025)
2021–22	Mike Woodson	21–14	9–11	9th	NCAA Division I first round
2022–23	Mike Woodson	23–12	12–8	T–2nd	NCAA Division I second round
2023–24	Mike Woodson	19–14	10–10	T–6th	
2024–25	Mike Woodson	19–13	10–10	9th	
Darian DeVries (Big Ten Conference) (2025–?)
2025–26	Darian DeVries	18-14	9-11	10th	
Total:		1,968-1,144			
National champion Postseason invitational champion Conference regular season champion Conference regular season and conference tournament champion Division regular season champion Division regular season and conference tournament champion Conference tournament champion

^A. Indiana and Purdue first met on March 2, 1901 in Bloomington, with a 20-15 Purdue win. Indiana originally planned to play a second game against Purdue in West Lafayette, but according to the Arbutus (the Indiana school yearbook) those games were "declared off, and the season ended at Indiana." The official records of Indiana and Purdue indicate that Indiana lost to Purdue 23–19 in West Lafayette on March 15, 1901. However, the Indiana University Basketball Encyclopedia by Jason Hiner notes that an absence of newspaper reports about the game suggests that it never took place. That source lists Indiana's record for the 1900–01 season as 1-3.
^B. Dakich served as the interim head coach at Indiana University, following Kelvin Sampson's resignation due to NCAA recruiting violations. Under Dakich's guidance, the Hoosiers went 3–4 and 3–2 in conference. Indiana went 22–4 under Sampson and 11–2 in conference.
