= 1914 College Basketball All-Southern Team =

The 1914 College Basketball All-Southern Team consisted of basketball players from the South chosen at their respective positions.

== All-Southerns ==
=== Guards ===
- Alonzo Dozier, Columbus YMCA (JB, FB)
- Ed Carter, Atlanta A. C. (JB)
- Pie Weaver, Atlanta A. C. (JB-2, FB-2)
- Biscoe Seals, Birmingham A. C. (JB-2)
- Chester Newman, Columbus YMCA (FB-2)
- Tom McGowan, Birmingham A. C. (FB-2 [as F])

=== Forwards ===
- Albert Peacock, University of Georgia (JB, FB)
- Tippo Peddy, Columbus YMCA (JB, FB)
- Willingham Smith, Atlanta A. C. (JB-2, FB-2)
- Tillou Forbes, Atlanta A. C. (JB-2)

=== Center ===
- Walter Dubard, Atlanta A. C. (JB, FB [as g])
- Bunk Clay, Bessemer A. C. (FB)
- Bud Massey, Columbus YMCA (JB-2, FB-2)

== Key ==
- JB = selected by Joe Bean, coach of Atlanta Athletic Club.
- FB = selected by Frank Bridges, coach of Columbus YMCA.
