= 1913 College Basketball All-Southern Team =

The 1913 College Basketball All-Southern Team consisted of basketball players from the South chosen at their respective positions.

== All-Southerns ==
=== Guards ===
- Alonzo Dozier, Columbus YMCA (FB, DJ)
- Carter, Columbus YMCA (DJ)
- Baumhauer, Mobile YMCA (FB)
- Jack Courtney, Mobile YMCA (FB-2)
- Biscoe Seals, Birmingham A. C. (DJ-2)
- Maiden, Mobile YMCA (DJ-2)

=== Forwards ===
- Tippo Peddy, Columbus YMCA (FB, DJ)
- Tom Soost, Mobile YMCA (FB-2, DJ)
- Woodie Penny, Mobile YMCA (FB-2, DJ-2)
- Willingham Smith, Atlanta A. C. (DJ-2)

=== Center ===
- Gilbert Ritchie, Birmingham A. C. (FB, DJ)
- Walter Dubard, Atlanta A. C. (FB [as F], DJ [as F])
- Bud Massey, Columbus YMCA (FB-2 [as g])
- H. Martin, Mobile YMCA (FB-2)

== Key ==
- FB = selected by Frank Bridges.
- DJ = selected by Dick Jemison.
