= 1907–08 Illinois Fighting Illini men's basketball team =

American college basketball season

1907–08 Illinois Fighting Illini men's basketball
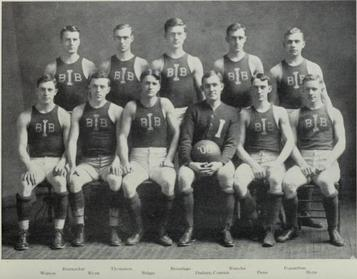
- Conference: Big Ten Conference
- Record: 20–7 (6–5 Big Ten)
- Head coach: Fletcher Lane (1st season)
- Captain: Maurice Dadant
- Home arena: Kenney Gym

1907–08 Western Conference men's basketball standings
	Conf.				Overall
Team	W		L	PCT	W		L	PCT
Chicago†	7	–	1	.875	23	–	2	.920
Wisconsin	7	–	1	.875	10	–	2	.833
Illinois	6	–	5	.545	20	–	6	.769
Minnesota	2	–	6	.250	12	–	7	.632
Purdue	0	–	8	.000	5	–	9	.357
Iowa	-	–	-	–	10	–	6	.625
Indiana	-	–	-	–	9	–	6	.600
Northwestern	-	–	-	–	2	–	7	.222
† Tie-breaker playoff game winner

The 1907–08 Illinois Fighting Illini men's basketball team represented the University of Illinois.

== Regular season ==
The 1907–08 season saw the third coach in three years take the reins at the University of Illinois. Fletcher Lane was Illinois’ third coach, but lasted just one season. Even though he led his team to a 20–6 record, the university, as well as the athletes, deemed Lane's coaching style as subpar. Lane's team benefited from a long Southern trip in which the team beat several YMCA and club teams from Tennessee, Texas, Alabama, and Georgia. The starting lineup consisted of forwards Albert Penn and H. J. Popperfuss, center Avery Brundage, and guards Thomas E. Thompson and captain M. G. Dadant.

=== Roster ===
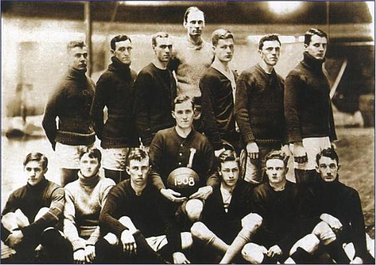
"1907-08 Fighting Illini team"

1907–08 Illinois Fighting Illini men's basketball team
Players
Coaches

Pos.	#	Name	Height	Weight	Year	Hometown
F		Charles Stewart	—	—	Sr	New York, New York
G		Edward Ryan	—	—	Sr	Chicago, Illinois
F		Henry Popperfuss	—	—	So	Tomah, Wisconsin
F		Maurice Dadant (C)	—	—	Sr	Hamilton, Illinois
G		Avery Brundage	—	—	Jr	Chicago, Illinois
G		Thomas E. Thompson	—	—	So	Williams Bay, Wisconsin
G		Roy Rennacker	—	—	So	Winnetka, Illinois
G		Carl Watson	—	—	Fr	DeKalb, Illinois
F		Albert Penn	—	—	Jr	Syracuse, New York
G		Strother Ambrose Briggs	—	—	Fr	Minier, Illinois
G		Benjamin Albert Horn	—	—	So	Chicago, Illinois

Head coach

- Fletcher Lane (University of Nebraska) (1st year)

Assistant coach(es)

Legend

- (C) Team captain
- (S) Suspended
- (I) Ineligible
- (W) Walk-on
- Injured
- Current redshirt

Roster

== Schedule ==
Date time, TV	Rank^{#}	Opponent^{#}	Result	Record	Site city, state
Non-Conference regular season
December 19, 1907*		at Decatur YMCA	W 33-28	1-0	Decatur YMCA; Decatur, IL
December 20, 1907*		at WashingtonU	W 36–25	2-0	Francis Gymnasium; St. Louis, MO
December 21, 1907*		at Cairo Athletic Club	W 92–14	3-0	Cairo Athletic Club; Cairo, IL
December 23, 1907*		at Memphis YMCA	W 56–8	4-0	Memphis YMCA; Memphis, TN
December 25, 1907*		at Ft. Worth YMCA	W 41–25	5-0	Ft. Worth YMCA; Ft. Worth, TX
December 25, 1907*		at Ft. Worth YMCA	W 32–20	6-0	Ft. Worth YMCA; Ft. Worth, TX
December 26, 1907*		at Waco YMCA	W 58–20	7-0	Waco YMCA; Waco, TX
December 27, 1907*		at Temple YMCA	W 36–17	8-0	Temple YMCA; Temple, TX
December 28, 1907*		at Galveston YMCA	W 41–21	9-0	Galveston YMCA; Galveston, TX
December 30, 1907*		at Beaumont YMCA	W 34–17	10-0	Beaumont YMCA; Beaumont, TX
January 1, 1908*		at Mobile YMCA	W 22–21	11-0	Mobile YMCA; Mobile, AL
January 2, 1908*		at Columbus YMCA	L 29-31	12-1	Columbus YMCA; Columbus, GA
January 2, 1908*		at Montgomery YMCA	L 21–31	12-2	Montgomery YMCA; Montgomery, AL
January 3, 1908*		at Birmingham Athletic Club	W 46–24	13-2	Birmingham Athletic Club; Birmingham, AL
January 4, 1908*		at Rose Polytechnic Institute	W 35–26	14-2	Terre Haute High School; Terre Haute, IN
Big Ten regular season
January 11, 1908		at Purdue	W 24–23	15-2 (1-0)	Lafayette Colliseum; West Lafayette, IN
January 18, 1908		Wisconsin	L 20–28	15-3 (1-1)	Kenney Gym; Urbana, IL
January 25, 1908		Indiana; Rivalry	W 39–12	16-3 (2-1)	Kenney Gym; Urbana, IL
February 8, 1908		University of Chicago	L 21–35	16-4 (2-2)	Kenney Gym; Urbana, IL
February 14, 1908		at Iowa; Rivalry	L 36–46	16-5 (2-3)	Iowa Armory; Iowa City, IA
February 15, 1908		at Minnesota	W 16–15	17-5 (3-3)	University of Minnesota Armory; Minneapolis, MN
February 29, 1908		Purdue	W 38–15	18-5 (4-3)	Kenney Gym; Urbana, IL
March 6, 1908		at University of Chicago	L 17–42	18-6 (4-4)	Bartlett Gymnasium; Chicago, IL
March 7, 1908		at Northwestern; Rivalry	W 18–13	19-6 (5-4)	Patten Gymnasium; Evanston, IL
March 9, 1908		at Wisconsin	L 14–27	19-7 (5-5)	University of Wisconsin Armory and Gymnasium; Madison, WI
March 12, 1908		Minnesota	W 22–20	20-7 (6-5)	Kenney Gym; Urbana, IL
*Non-conference game. ^{#}Rankings from AP Poll. (#) Tournament seedings in parentheses. All times are in Central Time.

== Awards and honors ==
- First 20 win season for the Fighting Illini men's basketball program.
