= 1909 College Basketball All-Southern Team =

The 1909 College Basketball All-Southern Team consisted of basketball players from the South chosen at their respective positions. Mobile YMCA was the best team in the South, despite only one player, Albert Haas, appearing on either the "heavy" or "light" All-Southern team.

== All-Southerns ==
=== Guards ===
- Estes, Birmingham A. C. (LT)
- Nesbitt, Nashville A. C. (LT)
- Hilty, Birmingham A. C. (HT)
- Susong, Montgomery YMCA (HT)

=== Forwards ===
- Thomas, Birmingham A. C. (LT)
- Tippo Peddy, Columbus YMCA (LT)
- Albert Haas, Mobile YMCA (HT)
- Bill Neely, Vanderbilt (HT)

=== Center ===
- Howell Peacock, Georgia (LT)
- Bob Ware, Birmingham A. C. (HT)

== Key ==
- HT = Heavy team selected by Burr Blackburn.
- LT = Light team selected by Burr Blackburn.
