= 1910 College Basketball All-Southern Team =

The 1910 College Basketball All-Southern Team consisted of basketball players from the South chosen at their respective positions for the 1909-10 basketball season. The Columbus YMCA basketball team was the best in the South. According to Atlanta Constitution sportswriter Dick Jemison, Columbus's Tippo Peddy was "without a doubt the best forward in the South". Jemison wrote later that Georgia center Howell Peacock was "by far the best center that ever stepped on a Southern floor". He also wrote that this year the best guard was Columbus' Jakey Pease. The other guard he selected was famed tennis player Dr. Nat Thornton.

== All-Southerns ==
=== Guards ===
- Jakey Pease, Columbus YMCA (DJ)
- Nat Thornton, Atlanta A. C. (DJ)

=== Forwards ===
- Tippo Peddy, Columbus YMCA (DJ)
- Schley Gordy, Auburn (DJ)

=== Center ===
- Howell Peacock, Georgia (DJ)

== Key ==
- DJ = selected by Dick Jemison.
