= 1911–12 Columbus YMCA basketball team =

1911–12 Columbus YMCA men's basketball
- Record: 13–3 ( )
- Head coach: Frank Bridges (1st season)
- Captain: Tom Lewis

The 1911–12 Columbus YMCA basketball team played basketball. The team consisted of Tom Lewis, Tippo Peddy, Schley Gordy, Bud Massey, Alonzo Dozier, Albert Peacock, and Charlie Newman

== Schedule ==
Date time, TV	Opponent	Result	Record	Site (attendance) city, state
*	Bessemer A. C.	W 53–11	1–0	Columbus, GA
*	Jacksonville YMCA	W 68–11	2–0	Columbus, GA
*	Central (MO)	W 71–11	3–0	Columbus, GA
*	Vanderbilt	W 44–21	4–0	Columbus, GA
*	Mobile YMCA	L 25–47	4–1	Columbus, GA
January 10*	Auburn	W 49–12	5–1	Columbus, GA
January 12*	Auburn	W 98–19	6–1	Columbus, GA
January 25*	Cumberland	W 89–28	7–1	Columbus, GA
February 2*	Birmingham A. C.	L 22–28	7–2	Columbus, GA
February 8*	at Mercer	W 47–23	8–2	Macon, GA
February 12*	at South Chattanooga	W 60–19	9–2	Chattanooga, TN
February 13*	at Knoxville YMCA	W 56–41	10–2	Knoxville, TN
February 19*	at Evansville A. C.	W 44–23	11–2	Evansville, IN
February 21*	at Cumberland	W 65–28	12–2	Lebanon, TN
February 23*	at Memphis YMCA	W 46–14	13–2	Memphis, TN
February 26*	at Birmingham A. C.	L 26–34	13–3	Birmingham, AL
*Non-conference game. (#) Tournament seedings in parentheses.
