= 1909–10 Columbus YMCA basketball team =

1909–10 Columbus YMCA men's basketball

Southern Champion
- Record: 19–0 ( )
- Head coach: W. L. Dowd (3rd season)
- Captain: Tippo Peddy

The 1909–10 Columbus YMCA basketball team won the Southern championship. Members of the team were guards Leonard "Jakey" Pease and Alonzo Dozier, forwards Tippo Peddy and Harold Lyons, and center Bud Massey. Also on the team were Chester Newman, Tom Lewis and Dana Kilcrease. Peddy was "without a doubt the best forward in the South". Pease and Peddy were All-Southern. The 1910 team was awarded an ovation on return from its road trip. The team outscored opponents 825 to 264.

Dick Jemison was on the Atlanta club beaten 54 to 13 and 47 to 26.

== Schedule ==
Date time, TV	Opponent	Result	Record	Site (attendance) city, state
*	Americus YMCA	W 72–2	1–0	Columbus, GA
*	Birmingham YMCA	W 46–17	2–0	Columbus, GA
December 16*	Montgomery YMCA	W 35–15	3–0	Columbus, GA
December 20*	Central	W 56–26	4–0	Columbus, GA
December 22*	Charlotte YMCA	W 62–17	5–0	Columbus, GA
December 29*	Vanderbilt	W 34–29	6–0	Columbus, GA
January 7*	Birmingham A. C.	W 53–15	7–0	Columbus, GA
January 14*	Auburn	W 44–8	8–0	Columbus, GA
January 22*	Atlanta A. C.	W 54–13	9–0	Columbus, GA
February 7*	at Atlanta A. C.	W 47–26	10–0	Atlanta
February 8*	at Spartanburg YMCA	W 89–11	11–0	Spartanburg
February 10*	at Charlotte YMCA	W 46–20	12–0	Charlotte
February 12*	at Wake Forest	W 54–15	13–0	Wake Forest
February 15*	at Trinity	W 34–15	14–0	The Ark; Durham, NC
February 16*	at Charlotte YMCA	W 51–22	15–0	Charlotte
February 20*	at Auburn	W 42–16	16–0	The Gymnasium; Auburn, AL
February 22*	at Birmingham A. C.	W 46–10	17–0	Birmingham, AL
*Non-conference game. (#) Tournament seedings in parentheses.
