= 1910–11 Illinois Fighting Illini men's basketball team =

American college basketball season

1910–11 Illinois Fighting Illini men's basketball
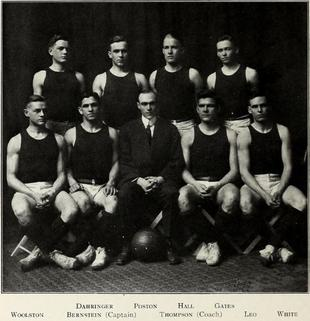
- Conference: Big Ten Conference
- Record: 6–6 (6–5 Big Ten)
- Head coach: Thomas E. Thompson (1st season)
- Captain: Louis Bernstein
- Home arena: Kenney Gym

1910–11 Western Conference men's basketball standings
	Conf.				Overall
Team	W		L	PCT	W		L	PCT
Purdue	8	–	4	.667	12	–	4	.750
Minnesota	8	–	4	.667	10	–	4	.714
Chicago	7	–	5	.583	10	–	4	.714
Illinois	6	–	5	.545	6	–	6	.500
Wisconsin	6	–	6	.500	6	–	6	.500
Indiana	5	–	5	.500	11	–	5	.688
Iowa	2	–	2	.500	9	–	4	.692
Northwestern	1	–	12	.077	4	–	15	.211

The 1910–11 Illinois Fighting Illini men's basketball team represented the University of Illinois.

== Regular season ==
The 1910–11 season witnessed only the second coach to remain for more than one season since the beginning of the program. Thomas E. Thompson led the Fighting Illini's basketball program for both the 1910–11 season and 1911–12 season compiling an overall record of 14 wins and 14 losses. Thompson claimed, at the time, to be the only player in Western Conference history to have played five years of collegiate basketball. He was at Northwestern for one year before playing at Illinois for four additional seasons. After leaving the coaching ranks, he founded The Thomas C. Thompson Company in Highland Park, IL, a manufacturer of enamel products.

The Illini finished the 1910–11 season with an overall record of six wins and six losses with a conference record of six wins, five losses and a fourth-place finish in the conference.

=== Roster ===
"1910-11 Fighting Illini team"

1910–11 Illinois Fighting Illini men's basketball team
Players
Coaches

Pos.	#	Name	Height	Weight	Year	Hometown
C		Emmett V. Poston	—	—	Sr	Springfield, Illinois
F		Carl Watson	—	—	Sr	DeKalb, Illinois
G		Louis S. Bernstein (C)	—	—	Sr	Niagara Falls, New York
G		James G. White	—	—	So	Chicago, Illinois
F		Albert L. Hall	—	—	Jr	Libertyville, Illinois
C		Chouncey B. Oliver	—	—	Jr	Blue Diamond, Nevada
C		Herbert T. Leo	—	—	Jr	Anaheim, California
G		William H. Woolston	—	—	So	Albuquerque, New Mexico
C		Homer W. Dahringer	—	—	Fr	Ludington, Michigan
F		Herbert J. Matter	—	—	Sr	Naperville, Illinois
F		Clarence John "Jack" Levey	—	—	So	Toronto, Ontario
F		Ralph Pillsbury Gates	—	—	Jr	Chicago, Illinois
F		Carl Morris Plochman	—	—	Fr	Evanston, Illinois

Head coach

- Thomas E. Thompson (University of Illinois) (1st year)

Assistant coach(es)

Legend

- (C) Team captain
- (S) Suspended
- (I) Ineligible
- (W) Walk-on
- Injured
- Current redshirt

Roster

== Schedule ==
Date time, TV	Rank^{#}	Opponent^{#}	Result	Record	Site city, state
Non-Conference regular season
12/31/1910*		at Evanston YMCA	L 19–28	0-1 (0-0)	Evanston YMCA; Evanston, IL
Big Ten regular season
1/7/1911		Indiana; Rivalry	W 32–22	1-1 (1-0)	Kenney Gym; Urbana, IL
1/14/1911		University of Chicago	L 17–23	1-2 (1-1)	Kenney Gym; Urbana, IL
1/20/1911		at Minnesota	W 18–17	2-2 (2-1)	University of Minnesota Armory; Minneapolis, MN
1/21/1911		at Wisconsin	L 17–20	2-3 (2-2)	University of Wisconsin Armory and Gymnasium; Madison, WI
1/28/1911		Purdue	L 29–33	2-4 (2-3)	Kenney Gym; Urbana, IL
2/17/1911		at Indiana; Rivalry	L 14–19	2-5 (2-4)	Old Assembly Hall; Bloomington, IN
2/18/1911		at Purdue	W 25–15	3-5 (3-4)	Memorial Gymnasium; West Lafayette, IN
2/24/1911		at University of Chicago	L 18–19	3-6 (3-5)	Bartlett Gymnasium; Chicago, IL
2/25/1911		at Northwestern; Rivalry	W 26–15	4-6 (4-5)	Patten Gymnasium; Evanston, IL
3/2/1911		Minnesota	W 22–12	5-6 (5-5)	Kenney Gym; Urbana, IL
3/11/1911		Wisconsin	W 21–18	6-6 (6-5)	Kenney Gym; Urbana, IL
*Non-conference game. ^{#}Rankings from AP Poll. (#) Tournament seedings in parentheses. All times are in Central Time.
