= 1911–12 Illinois Fighting Illini men's basketball team =

American college basketball season

1911–12 Illinois Fighting Illini men's basketball
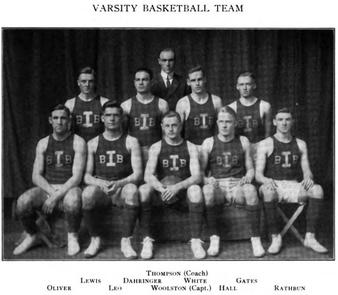
- Conference: Big Ten Conference
- Record: 8–8 (4–8 Big Ten)
- Head coach: Thomas E. Thompson (2nd season)
- Captain: William Woolston
- Home arena: Kenney Gym

1911–12 Western Conference men's basketball standings
| | Conf. | | | | Overall |
| Team | W | | L | PCT | W | | L | PCT |
|---|---|---|---|---|---|---|---|---|
| Wisconsin† | 12 | – | 0 | 1.000 | 15 | – | 0 | 1.000 |
| Purdue† | 10 | – | 0 | 1.000 | 12 | – | 0 | 1.000 |
| Chicago | 7 | – | 5 | .583 | 12 | – | 6 | .667 |
| Minnesota | 6 | – | 6 | .500 | 7 | – | 6 | .538 |
| Illinois | 4 | – | 8 | .333 | 8 | – | 8 | .500 |
| Indiana | 2 | – | 9 | .182 | 6 | – | 11 | .353 |
| Iowa | 0 | – | 4 | .000 | 6 | – | 8 | .429 |
| Northwestern | 0 | – | 8 | .000 | 4 | – | 9 | .308 |
| Ohio State | 0 | – | 0 | – | 7 | – | 5 | .583 |
† Conference co-championship winner

The 1911–12 Illinois Fighting Illini men's basketball team represented the University of Illinois.

== Regular season ==
The 1911–12 season was Thomas E. Thompson's second year as head coach of the Illinois Fighting Illini men's basketball team. Under Thompson's guidance the Illini experienced a perfect non-conference season while at the same time having a less than perfect conference record. Overall the team played to an eight win, eight loss record, however; all of the season's losses were within Western Conference play. During conference play the team won six times and placed fifth overall. The starting lineup for the team included; Albert L. Hall, Homer W. Dahringer and R. P. Gates as forwards, H. T. Leo as the center, with James G. White and captain William H. Woolston at the guard positions.

=== Roster ===
1911–12 Illinois Fighting Illini men's basketball team
Players
Coaches

| Pos. | # | Name | Height | Weight | Year | Hometown |
|---|---|---|---|---|---|---|
| F | | Earl E. Rathbun | — | — | Jr | Glen Ellyn, Illinois |
| F | | Albert L. Hall | — | — | Sr | Libertyville, Illinois |
| G | | James G. White | — | — | Jr | Chicago, Illinois |
| C | | Homer W. Dahringer | — | — | Jr | Ludington, Michigan |
| G | | William H. Woolston (C) | — | — | Jr | Albuquerque, New Mexico |
| C | | Herbert T. Leo | — | — | Sr | Anaheim, California |
| C | | Chouncey B. Oliver | — | — | Sr | Blue Diamond, Nevada |
| F | | Ralph Pillsbury Gates | — | — | Sr | Chicago, Illinois |
| G | | John Edwin Lewis | — | — | So | Wheaton, Illinois |
| C | | Edward Everette Waters | — | — | Sr | Chicago, Illinois |
| C | | Anthony Power Lagoria | — | — | Sr | Chicago, Illinois |

Head coach

- Thomas E. Thompson (University of Illinois) (2nd year)

Assistant coach(es)

Legend

- (C) Team captain
- (S) Suspended
- (I) Ineligible
- (W) Walk-on
- Injured
- Current redshirt

Roster

== Schedule ==
| Date time, TV | Rank^{#} | Opponent^{#} | Result | Record | Site city, state |
Non-Conference regular season
| 12/16/1911* | | at Millikin | W 48–8 | 1-0 | Millikin Gymnasium; Decatur, IL |
| 12/29/1911* | | at Evanston YMCA | W 43–8 | 2-0 | Evanston YMCA; Evanston, IL |
| 12/30/1911* | | at Evanston YMCA | W 37–7 | 3-0 | Evanston YMCA; Evanston, IL |
| 1/5/1912* | | Illinois Wesleyan | W 44–12 | 4-0 | Kenney Gym; Urbana, IL |
Big Ten regular season
| 1/12/1912 | | at Minnesota | L 16–22 | 4-1 (0-1) | University of Minnesota Armory; Minneapolis, MN |
| 1/14/1912 | | at Wisconsin | L 10–27 | 4-2 (0-2) | University of Wisconsin Armory and Gymnasium; Madison, WI |
| 1/20/1912 | | at University of Chicago | L 20–21 | 4-3 (0-3) | Kenney Gym; Urbana, IL |
| 1/27/1912 | | Purdue | L 20–35 | 4-4 (0-4) | Kenney Gym; Urbana, IL |
| 2/6/1912 | | at Purdue | L 14–28 | 4-5 (0-5) | Memorial Gymnasium; West Lafayette, IN |
| 2/7/1912 | | at Indiana; Rivalry | L 24–25 | 4-6 (0-6) | Old Assembly Hall; Bloomington, IN |
| 2/10/1912 | | Minnesota | W 13–10 | 5-6 (1-6) | Kenney Gym; Urbana, IL |
| 2/23/1912 | | Indiana; Rivalry | W 41–16 | 6-6 (2-6) | Kenney Gym; Urbana, IL |
| 3/2/1912 | | Northwestern; Rivalry | W 25–10 | 7-6 (3-6) | Kenney Gym; Urbana, IL |
| 3/8/1912 | | at University of Chicago | L 12–17 | 7-7 (3-7) | Bartlett Gymnasium; Chicago, IL |
| 3/9/1912 | | at Northwestern | W 30–19 | 8-7 (4-7) | Patten Gymnasium; Evanston, IL |
| 3/15/1912 | | Wisconsin | L 15–23 | 8-8 (4-8) | Kenney Gym; Urbana, IL |
*Non-conference game. ^{#}Rankings from AP Poll. (#) Tournament seedings in parentheses. All times are in Central Time.
