= List of Illinois Fighting Illini men's basketball head coaches =

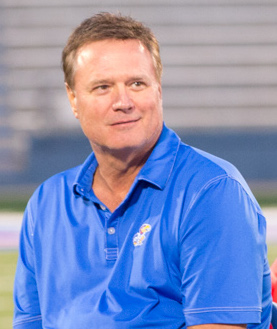
Bill Self led the team to 2 Big Ten titles in 3 seasons of coaching.

The following is a list of Illinois Fighting Illini men's basketball head coaches updated through the U of I official record book.

The men's college basketball program of the University of Illinois at Urbana–Champaign was founded in 1905 and is known competitively as the Fighting Illini. The team has had 18 head coaches in its history, and they have won 2 Helms and Premo-Porretta National Championship. Ralph Jones won the first national championship while finishing his career with an overall record of 85–34 (.714 winning percentage). Douglas Mills coached the second national champion while finishing his career with an overall record of 151–66 (.696 winning percentage). Lou Henson, after a 21-year stint as head coach, compiled the most wins in Illini history finishing his time in Urbana-Champaign with a record of 423–224. Additionally, Bill Self maintains the highest winning percentage of all-time at .765 (78 wins and only 24 losses).

| Coach | Years | Conference Record | Winning Pct | Overall Record | Winning Pct | Conference Titles | Conference Tournament Titles | NCAA Tournament/NIT Appearances | National Championships |
|---|---|---|---|---|---|---|---|---|---|
| Elwood Brown | 1905–1906 | 3–6 | .333 | 6–8 | .426 | 0 | – | – | 0 |
| Frank L. Pinckney | 1906-1907 | 0–8 | .000 | 1–10 | .090 | 0 | – | – | 0 |
| Fletcher Lane | 1907–1908 | 6–5 | .545 | 20–6 | .769 | 0 | – | – | 0 |
| Herb Juul | 1908–1910 | 10–10 | .500 | 12–10 | .545 | 0 | – | – | 0 |
| Thomas E. Thompson | 1910–1912 | 10–13 | .435 | 14–14 | .500 | 0 | – | – | 0 |
| Ralph Jones | 1912-1920 | 64–31 | .674 | 85–34 | .714 | 2 | – | – | 1 |
| Frank Winters | 1920–1922 | 14–10 | .583 | 25–12 | .676 | 0 | – | – | 0 |
| J. Craig Ruby | 1922–1936 | 94–74 | .559 | 148–95 | .609 | 2 | – | – | 0 |
| Douglas R. Mills | 1936–1947 | 88–47 | .652 | 151–66 | .696 | 3 | - | 1* | 0 |
| Harry Combes | 1947–1967 | 174–104 | .626 | 316–150 | .678 | 4 | - | 4 | 0 |
| Harv Schmidt | 1967–1974 | 43–55 | .439 | 89–77 | .536 | 0 | - | 0 | 0 |
| Gene Bartow | 1974–1975 | 4–14 | .222 | 8–18 | .308 | 0 | - | 0 | 0 |
| Lou Henson | 1975–1996 | 214–164 | .566 | 423–224 | .654 | 1 | - | 15 | 0 |
| Lon Kruger | 1996–2000 | 38–28 | .576 | 81–48 | .623 | 1 | 0 | 3 | 0 |
| Bill Self | 2000–2003 | 35–13 | .729 | 78–24 | .765 | 2 | 1 | 3 | 0 |
| Bruce Weber | 2003–2012 | 89-65 | .576 | 210-101 | .675 | 2 | 1 | 7 | 0 |
| John Groce | 2012–2017 | 37–53 | .411 | 95–75 | .559 | 0 | 0 | 1 | 0 |
| Jamall Walker | 2017 | 0–0 | .000 | 2–1 | .667 | 0 | 0 | 0 | 0 |
| Brad Underwood | 2017-current | 107-71 | .601 | 193-110 | .637 | 1 | 2 | 6 | 0 |
| Totals | 18 coaches | 989-752 | (.568) | 1,878–1052 | (.641) | 18 | 4 | 42 | 1 |

- The National Invitation Tournament began in 1938.
- The NCAA Men's Division I Basketball Championship began in 1939.
- The Big Ten Conference men's basketball tournament began in 1998.
- Jamall Walker coached 3 games as interim head coach in the National Invitation Tournament.

*The 1942-43 team elected not to enter the NCAA tournament; however, it was named national champion by the Premo-Porretta foundation. The university does not recognize this as a National Title in its count.
