= 1912–13 Columbus YMCA basketball team =

1912–13 Columbus YMCA men's basketball

Southern Champion
- Record: 7–1 ( )
- Head coach: Frank Bridges
- Captain: Chester Newman

The 1912–13 Columbus YMCA basketball team tied with Mobile YMCA for the Southern championship. Tippo Peddy scored 33 in a 43 to 26 win over Atlanta Athletic Club.

== Schedule ==
Date time, TV	Opponent	Result	Record	Site (attendance) city, state
January 4*	Atlanta A. C.	W 68–27	1–0	Columbus, GA
January 17*	Mobile YMCA	W 40–19	2–0	Columbus, GA
February 8*	Birmingham A. C.	W 39–23	3–0	Columbus, GA
February 10*	Mercer	W 90–27	4–0	Columbus, GA
February 17*	at Mobile YMCA	L 30–49	4–1	Mobile, AL
February 19*	at Birmingham A. C.	W 40–15	5–1	Birmingham, AL
February 20*	at Bessemer A. C.	W 50–20	6–1	Bessemer, AL
February 22*	at Atlanta A. C.	W 43–26	7–1	Atlanta, GA
*Non-conference game. (#) Tournament seedings in parentheses.
