= 1911–12 Birmingham A. C. basketball team =

1911–12 Birmingham A.C. college basketball team

1911–12 Birmingham A. C. men's basketball

Southern Champion
- Captain: Guy Wharton

The 1911–12 Birmingham Athletic Club basketball team won the Southern championship. The team beat Columbus YMCA twice. The team was guards Biscoe Seals and Guy Wharton, forward Tom McGowan and Harry Satterfield, and center Gilbert Ritchie.
