= 1908 NCAA Men's Basketball All-Americans =

- Awarded for: 1907–08 IAAUS men's basketball season

The 1908 College Basketball All-American team, as chosen retroactively by the Helms Athletic Foundation. The player highlighted in gold was chosen as the Helms Foundation College Basketball Player of the Year retroactively in 1944.

Player	Team
Hugh Harper	Wisconsin
Julian Hayward	Wesleyan (Conn.)
Charles Keinath	Penn
Haskell Noyes	Yale
Pat Page	Chicago
John Pryor	Brown
John Ryan	Columbia
John Schommer	Chicago
Ira Streusand	CCNY
Helmer Swenholt	Wisconsin

== See also ==
- 1907–08 IAAUS men's basketball season
