= Haskell Noyes =

American college basketball player and coach and noted conservationist

Biographical details
- Born: July 22, 1886; Milwaukee, Wisconsin, U.S.
- Died: December 8, 1948 (aged 62); Milwaukee, Wisconsin, U.S.

Playing career
- 1904–1908: Yale
- Position: Guard

Coaching career (HC unless noted)
- 1908–1911: Wisconsin
- 1913–1914: Yale

Head coaching record
- Overall: 37–22 (.627)

Accomplishments and honors

Awards
- NCAA All-American (1908)

Haskell Noyes (July 22, 1886 – December 8, 1948) was an American college basketball player and coach as well as a noted conservationist.

Born into a well-to-do family of Milwaukee, Wisconsin, Noyes attended Yale University from 1904 to 1908. He played for their basketball team and was the captain for his final two seasons. As a senior in 1907–08, Noyes was selected as a consensus All-American by the Helms Athletic Foundation.

After graduation, Noyes spent the next three years in his home state, serving as the head coach of the University of Wisconsin–Madison's basketball team. In three seasons in charge of the Badgers, Noyes compiled a 26–15 overall record. Two years later, he found himself in charge of Yale's team. For the 1913–14 season, his only as their head coach, Yale recorded an 11–7 record.

During his time in Wisconsin, Noyes became greatly interested in conserving the environment. And although he had earned a law degree from the University of Wisconsin Law School, he decided to pursue his passion. In 1926, he proposed a law that centralized conservationism in Wisconsin under a director and six unpaid commissioners. In 1930, he established the Haskell Noyes Conservation Warden Efficiency Award, which is still given annually to the person selected as the top Warden in Wisconsin.

Noyes died on December 8, 1948, several days after falling and fracturing his skull. He was 62 years old. In 2000, he was posthumously inducted into the Wisconsin Conservation Hall of Fame.

== Head coaching record ==
Record table
Season	Team	Overall	Conference	Standing	Postseason
Wisconsin Badgers (Western Conference) (1908–1911)
1908–09	Wisconsin	8–4	5–4	3rd	
1909–10	Wisconsin	9–5	7–5	3rd	
1910–11	Wisconsin	9–6	6–6	5th	
Wisconsin:		26–15 (.634)	18–15 (.545)		
Yale Bulldogs (Eastern Intercollegiate Basketball League) (1913–1914)
1913–14	Yale	11–7	6–4	3rd	
Yale:		11–7 (.611)	6–4 (.600)		
Total:		37–22 (.627)			
National champion Postseason invitational champion Conference regular season champion Conference regular season and conference tournament champion Division regular season champion Division regular season and conference tournament champion Conference tournament champion
