= 1907–08 Columbus YMCA basketball team =

1907–08 Columbus YMCA men's basketball

Southern champion
- Record: 12–0 ( )
- Head coach: W. L. Dowd (1st season)
- Captain: Howell Peacock

The 1907–08 Columbus YMCA basketball team won the Southern championship. The team was coached by W. L. Dowd and captained by center Howell Peacock. The rest of the five were guards Alonzo Dozier and Chester Newman; and forwards Tippo Peddy and Tom Lewis. The team beat Illinois. The team finished with no substitutions. Dozier busted his knee open against the seats in the last game against Auburn, and the team finished the game with four men.

== Schedule ==
Date time, TV	Opponent	Result	Record	Site (attendance) city, state
November 26, 1908*	at Montgomery YMCA	W 38–29	1–0	Montgomery, AL
December 7, 1908*	Montgomery YMCA	W 69–20	2–0	Columbus, GA
December 14, 1907*	Birmingham YMCA	W 89–11	3–0	Columbus, GA
December 27, 1907*	All-college	W 61–9	4–0	Columbus, GA
January 2, 1908*	Illinois	W 31–29	5–0	Columbus, GA
January 17*	Auburn	W 37–32	6–0	Columbus, GA
February 7, 1908	vs. Georgia	W 50–28	7–0	Columbus, GA
February 14, 1908*	at Atlanta YMCA	W 61–24	8–0	Atlanta, GA
February 20*	Wake Forest	W 62–18	9–0	Columbus, GA
February 21, 1908*	at Montgomery YMCA	W 33–28	10–0	Montgomery, AL
February 22, 1908*	at Birmingham YMCA	W 27–20	11–0	Birmingham, AL
March 2, 1908*	at Auburn	W 33–19	12–0	The Gymnasium (550); Auburn, AL
*Non-conference game. (#) Tournament seedings in parentheses.
