= 1907–08 Auburn Tigers men's basketball team =

American college basketball season

1907–08 Auburn Tigers men's basketball
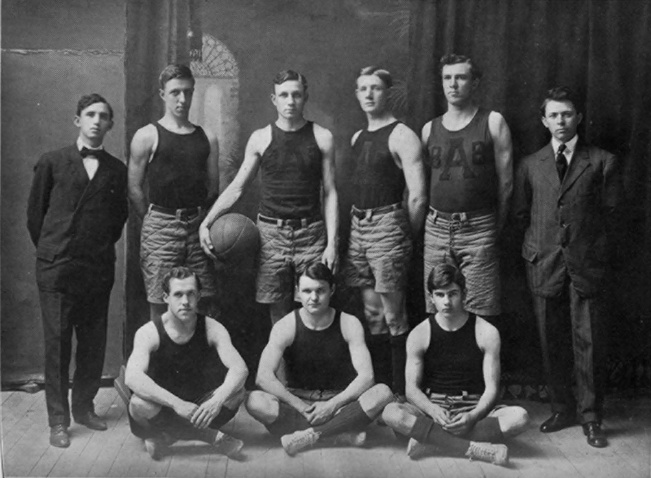

SIAA champion
- Conference: Southern Intercollegiate Athletic Association
- Record: 6–5 (1–0 SIAA)
- Head coach: Mike Donahue (3rd season)
- Captain: R.Y. Ware
- Home arena: The Gymnasium

The 1907–08 Auburn Tigers men's basketball team represented Auburn University during the 1907–08 college basketball season. The head coach was Mike Donahue, coaching his third season with the Tigers. Auburn defeated Georgia, who was led by Claud Derrick. The game with Columbus YMCA decided the Southern championship. Asheville YMCA then challenged Columbus.

== Schedule ==
Date time, TV	Opponent	Result	Record	Site (attendance) city, state
January 17*	Columbus YMCA	L 32–37	0–1	
February 5, 1908*	at Montgomery YMCA	W 25–18	1–1	Montgomery, AL
February 8, 1908*	Birmingham Athletic Club	W 26–14	2–1	The Gymnasium; Auburn, AL
February 11	vs. Georgia	W 34–20	3–1	Columbus, GA
February 15*	at Birmingham Athletic Club	L 21–25	3–2	Birmingham, AL
February 16, 1908*	at Bessemer Athletic Club	W 34–13	4–2	Bessemer, AL
*	Wetumpka Athletic Club	W 47–11	5–2	The Gymnasium; Auburn, AL
*	Montgomery YMCA	L 21–27	5–3	
*	Wake Forest	W 38–13	6–3	
February 22, 1908*	Montgomery YMCA	L 27–31	6–4	The Gymnasium; Auburn, AL
March 2, 1908*	Columbus YMCA	L 19–33	6–5	The Gymnasium (550); Auburn, AL
*Non-conference game. (#) Tournament seedings in parentheses.
