= 1911–12 Indiana Hoosiers men's basketball team =

American college basketball season

1911–12 Indiana Hoosiers men's basketball
- Conference: Big Ten Conference
- Record: 6–11 (2–9 Western)
- Head coach: James Kase (1st season)
- Captain: Merrill Davis
- Home arena: Old Assembly Hall

1911–12 Western Conference men's basketball standings
| | Conf. | | | | Overall |
| Team | W | | L | PCT | W | | L | PCT |
|---|---|---|---|---|---|---|---|---|
| Wisconsin† | 12 | – | 0 | 1.000 | 15 | – | 0 | 1.000 |
| Purdue† | 10 | – | 0 | 1.000 | 12 | – | 0 | 1.000 |
| Chicago | 7 | – | 5 | .583 | 12 | – | 6 | .667 |
| Minnesota | 6 | – | 6 | .500 | 7 | – | 6 | .538 |
| Illinois | 4 | – | 8 | .333 | 8 | – | 8 | .500 |
| Indiana | 2 | – | 9 | .182 | 6 | – | 11 | .353 |
| Iowa | 0 | – | 4 | .000 | 6 | – | 8 | .429 |
| Northwestern | 0 | – | 8 | .000 | 4 | – | 9 | .308 |
| Ohio State | 0 | – | 0 | – | 7 | – | 5 | .583 |
† Conference co-championship winner

The 1911–12 Indiana Hoosiers men's basketball team represented Indiana University. Their head coach was James Kase, who was in his first and only year. The team played its home games at the Old Assembly Hall in Bloomington, Indiana, and was a member of the Western Conference.

The Hoosiers finished the regular season with an overall record of 6–11 and a conference record of 1–9, finishing 6th in the Western Conference.

== Roster ==
| Name | Position | Year | Hometown |
|---|---|---|---|
| Clyde Chattin | F | Sr. | Shoals, Indiana |
| Cline Clouse | G | N/A | Hope, Indiana |
| Merrill Davis | G | Sr. | Marion, Indiana |
| Scott Edwards | G | N/A | Greenfield, Indiana |
| Floyd Fleming | G | N/A | New Albany, Indiana |
| Haynes Freeland | F | Jr. | Indianapolis, Indiana |
| Phil Graves | C | Sr. | Orleans, Indiana |
| Everett McCullough | G | N/A | Brazil, Indiana |
| Glen Munkelt | F | Jr. | Salem, Indiana |
| Chester Stayton | G | N/A | Mooresville, Indiana |

== Schedule/results ==
| Date time, TV | Rank^{#} | Opponent^{#} | Result | Record | Site city, state |
Regular season
| 1/16/1912* | | Butler | W 15–12 | 1–0 | Old Assembly Hall; Bloomington, IN |
| 1/19/1912* | | DePauw | W 23–15 | 2–0 | Old Assembly Hall; Bloomington, IN |
| 1/24/1912 | | Purdue; Rivalry | L 18–54 | 2–1 (0–1) | Old Assembly Hall; Bloomington, IN |
| 1/27/1912* | | at Rose Poly | L 24–45 | 2–2 (0–1) | Terre Haute, IN |
| 1/29/1912* | | Ohio State | W 34–20 | 3–2 (1–1) | Old Assembly Hall; Bloomington, IN |
| 2/3/1912 | | Chicago | L 16–20 | 3–3 (1–2) | Old Assembly Hall; Bloomington, IN |
| 2/7/1912 | | Illinois; Rivalry | W 24–23 | 4–3 (2–2) | Old Assembly Hall; Bloomington, IN |
| 2/9/1912* | | at Earlham | W 25–13 | 5–3 (2–2) | Richmond, IN |
| 2/10/1912* | | at Butler | L 17–23 | 5–4 (2–2) | Indianapolis, IN |
| 2/16/1912 | | at Wisconsin | L 10–49 | 5–5 (2–3) | Red Gym; Madison, WI |
| 2/17/1912 | | at Minnesota | L 7–34 | 5–6 (2–4) | UM Armory; Minneapolis, MN |
| 2/23/1912 | | at Illinois; Rivalry | L 18–41 | 5–7 (2–5) | Kenney Gym; Urbana, IL |
| 2/24/1912 | | at Chicago | L 22–36 | 5–8 (2–6) | Bartlett Gymnasium; Chicago, IL |
| 3/3/1912 | | at Purdue; Rivalry | L 11–45 | 5–9 (2–7) | Memorial Gymnasium; West Lafayette, IN |
| 3/9/1912* | | Rose Poly | W 29–16 | 6–9 (2–7) | Old Assembly Hall; Bloomington, IN |
| 3/13/1912 | | Minnesota | L 17–26 | 6–10 (2–8) | Old Assembly Hall; Bloomington, IN |
| 3/16/1912 | | Wisconsin | L 21–34 | 6–11 (2–9) | Old Assembly Hall; Bloomington, IN |
*Non-conference game. ^{#}Rankings from AP Poll. (#) Tournament seedings in parentheses.
