= Hugh A. Harper =

American politician (1885–1963)

Hugh Allen Harper (December 24, 1885 – August 8, 1963) was a member of the Wisconsin State Assembly.

== Biography ==
Harper was born on Christmas Eve of 1885 in Lancaster, Wisconsin. He graduated from the University of Wisconsin–Madison in 1908 and served in the National Guard of the United States. He served on the school, town, and county boards. While at the University of Wisconsin, Harper played basketball for the Badgers and was retroactively named an All-American for his senior season of 1907–08.

He died in Lancaster on August 8, 1963.

== Political career ==
Harper was a member of the Assembly on three occasions. First from 1931 to 1936, second, from 1945 to 1952 and third, from 1957 to 1963. He was a Republican.
