= 1907–08 Chicago Maroons men's basketball team =

American college basketball season

1907–08 Chicago Maroons men's basketball
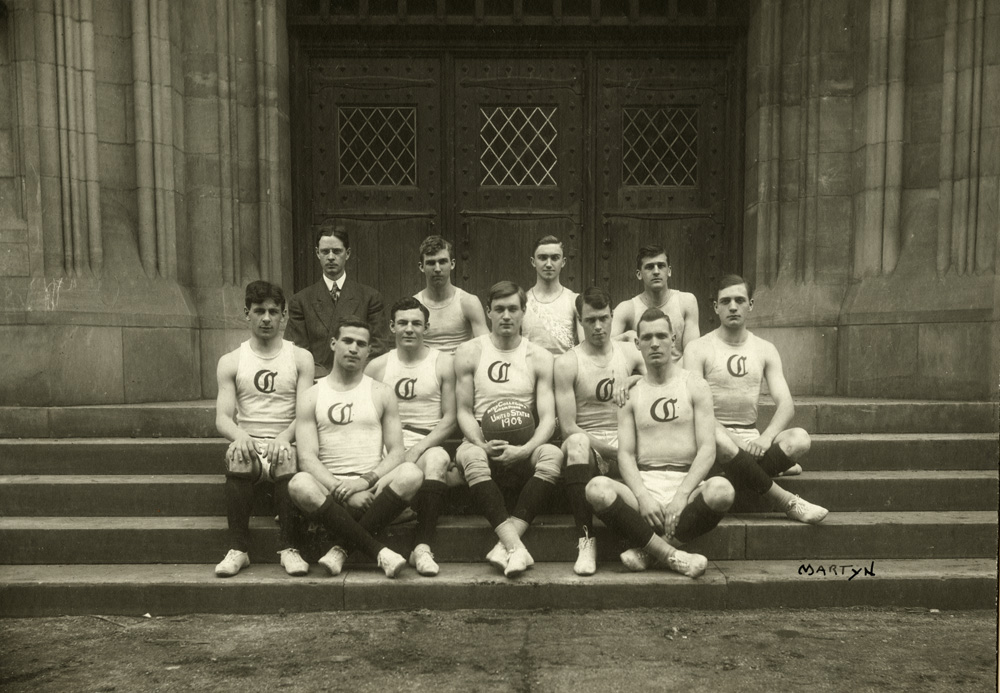

Intercollegiate National Champions Western Conference Champions Helms Foundation National Champions
- Conference: Big Ten Conference
- Record: 23–2 (7–1 Western)
- Head coach: Joseph Raycroft (2nd season)
- Captain: John Schommer
- Home arena: Bartlett Gymnasium

1907–08 Western Conference men's basketball standings
	Conf.				Overall
Team	W		L	PCT	W		L	PCT
Chicago†	7	–	1	.875	23	–	2	.920
Wisconsin	7	–	1	.875	10	–	2	.833
Illinois	6	–	5	.545	20	–	6	.769
Minnesota	2	–	6	.250	12	–	7	.632
Purdue	0	–	8	.000	5	–	9	.357
Iowa	-	–	-	–	10	–	6	.625
Indiana	-	–	-	–	9	–	6	.600
Northwestern	-	–	-	–	2	–	7	.222
† Tie-breaker playoff game winner

The 1907–08 Chicago Maroons men's basketball team represented the University of Chicago in intercollegiate basketball during the 1907–08 season. The team finished the season with a 23–2 record and were retroactively named national champions by the Helms Athletic Foundation. This was the second straight year that Chicago was later named the Helms national championship. The team played their home games on campus at Frank Dickinson Bartlett Gymnasium.

Both Pat Page and John Schommer were named All-Americans. For Schommer, it was his third consecutive All-American honor; for Page, it was his second.

== Championship ==
For the first time in college basketball's short history, a true national championship was awarded based on a "best-of-three" playoff series played by the presumptuous best two teams in the nation. In order to get to this series, however, the Maroons had to win the Western Conference. Based on the fact the Maroons and the Wisconsin Badgers had split the two games during the regular season, Coach Raycroft and Wisconsin physical education director Charles P. Hutchins agreed that a title game needed to be played. The game was played in Madison, however, the Maroons came out victorious and were not only awarded the conference title, this also determined who would meet the Quakers of Pennsylvania.

It would only take two games for the Maroons to win the series. The first game was played at Bartlett Gymnasium with a final score of 21 to 18. The second game was played in Philadelphia with a final score of 18 to 16. Besides the fact that a series of games were played to determine a national champion, the Maroons proved that they were worthy of the title by defeating 23 of the 25 opponents they faced during the season. Meanwhile, with a season that included over 20 games, Pennsylvania met and defeated all of the teams they faced in the east.

== Roster ==
Player	Position	Class	Hometown
Frederick H. Falls	Forward	Sophomore	Chicago, Illinois
William M. Georgen	Forward	Junior	Belvidere, Illinois
Harlan "Pat" Page	Guard	Sophomore	Chicago, Illinois
Arthur Hoffman	Guard	Sophomore	Chicago, Illinois
Robert Harris	Guard	Senior	Chicago, Illinois
John Schommer, captain	Center	Junior	Chicago, Illinois
Edwin Hubble	Forward	Sophomore	Marshfield, Missouri
Paul Buhlig	Forward	Senior	Chicago, Illinois
Mansfield Cleary	Guard	Sophomore	Oak Park, Illinois
Alfred Kelly	Guard	Freshman	Ewing, Illinois

- Head coach: Joseph Raycroft (2nd year at Chicago)

== Schedule ==
Date time, TV	Opponent	Result	Record	Site city, state
12/20/1907 no, no	@ Iowa	W 35–26	1-0 (0-0)	Iowa Armory; Iowa City, IA
12/21/1907* no, no	@ Washington University	W 30-10	2-0 (0-0)	Francis Gymnasium; St. Louis, MO
12/23/1907* no, no	@ Kansas City A.A.	W 49-19	3-0 (0-0)	Kansas City A.A. Kansas City, MO
12/25/1907* no, no	@ Des Moines YMCA	W 31–23	4-0 (0-0)	Des Moines Coliseum; Des Moines, IA
12/26/1907* no, no	@ Muscatine YMCA	W 60–26	5-0 (0-0)	Muscatine YMCA; Muscatine, IA
1/4/1908* no, no	vs. Columbia	W 28-13	6-0 (0-0)	Bartlett Gymnasium; Chicago, IL
1/10/1908 no, no	vs. Indiana	W 49–18	7-0 (0-0)	Bartlett Gymnasium; Chicago, IL
1/18/1908 no, no	vs. Iowa	W 29–10	8-0 (0-0)	Bartlett Gymnasium; Chicago, IL
1/21/1908* no, no	@ Central YMCA	L 17–27	8-1 (0-0)	Central YMCA; Chicago, IL
1/25/1908 no, no	vs. Purdue	W 53–11	9-1 (1-0)	Bartlett Gymnasium; Chicago, IL
1/31/1908 no, no	@ Wisconsin	L 17–29	9-2 (1-1)	University of Wisconsin Armory and Gymnasium; Madison, WI
2/6/1908* no, no	vs. Central YMCA	W 30–14	10-2 (1-1)	Bartlett Gymnasium; Chicago, IL
2/8/1908 no, no	@ Illinois	W 35–21	11-2 (2-1)	Kenney Gym; Urbana, IL
2/13/1908 no, no	vs. Northwestern	W 41-6	12-2 (2-1)	Bartlett Gymnasium; Chicago, IL
2/15/1908 no, no	@ Purdue	W 31–19	13-2 (3-1)	Lafayette Colliseum; West Lafayette, IN
2/22/1908 no, no	@ Minnesota	W 26–23	14-2 (4-1)	University of Minnesota Armory; Minneapolis, MN
2/28/1908 no, no	vs. Wisconsin	W 24–19	15-2 (5-1)	Bartlett Gymnasium; Chicago, IL
2/29/1908 no, no	@ Northwestern	W 18–10	16-2 (6-1)	Patten Gymnasium; Evanston, IL
3/6/1908 no, no	vs. Illinois	W 42–17	17-2 (6-1)	Bartlett Gymnasium; Chicago, IL
3/12/1908* no, no	@ Wisconsin; Conference Title Game	W 18–16	18-2 (6-1)	University of Wisconsin Armory and Gymnasium; Madison, WI
3/14/1908 no, no	vs. Minnesota	W 22–12	19-2 (7-1)	Bartlett Gymnasium; Chicago, IL
3/21/1908* no, no	vs. Pennsylvania	W 21–18	20-2 (7-1)	Bartlett Gymnasium; Chicago, IL
3/25/1908* no, no	@ Pennsylvania	W 16–15	21-2 (7-1)	University of Pennsylvania; Philadelphia, PA
*Non-conference game. ^{#}Rankings from AP Poll. (#) Tournament seedings in parentheses. All times are in Central Time.

== Player stats ==
Player	Games Played	Field Goals	Free Throws Made	Points
John Schommer	22	84	82	250
Frederick Falls	22	72	44	188
William Georgen	20	40	0	80
Robert Harris	20	28	11	67
Pat Page	20	14	1	29
Arthur Hoffman	13	12	0	24
