= Pie Weaver =

American basketball player (1892–1943)

Personal information
- Born: September 9, 1892 Atlanta, Georgia, US
- Died: January 9, 1943 (aged 50) San Antonio, Texas, US
- Position: Guard

Career history
- 1911–1916: Atlanta Athletic Club

Career highlights
- Second-team All-Southern (1914)

Lamar "Pie" Weaver (September 9, 1892 – January 9, 1943) was an American basketball player for the Atlanta Athletic Club, "one of the best known basketball players in the South." He served in World War I, and continued his career in the army until his death. Weaver played on the Southern champion 1914 A. A. C. team coached by Joe Bean. Weaver was a so-called stationary guard. He is buried at Arlington National Cemetery.
