= 1915–16 Indiana Hoosiers men's basketball team =

American college basketball season

1915–16 Indiana Hoosiers men's basketball
- Conference: Big Ten Conference
- Record: 6–7 (3–5 Western)
- Head coach: Allan Williford (1st season)
- Captain: Allen Maxwell
- Home arena: Old Assembly Hall

1915–16 Western Conference men's basketball standings
	Conf.				Overall
Team	W		L	PCT	W		L	PCT
Wisconsin	11	–	1	.917	20	–	1	.952
Illinois	9	–	3	.750	13	–	3	.813
Northwestern	9	–	3	.750	13	–	3	.813
Minnesota	6	–	6	.500	11	–	6	.647
Indiana	3	–	5	.375	6	–	7	.462
Chicago	4	–	8	.333	15	–	11	.577
Iowa	2	–	4	.333	11	–	4	.733
Ohio State	2	–	8	.200	9	–	13	.409
Purdue	2	–	10	.167	4	–	10	.286

The 1915–16 Indiana Hoosiers men's basketball team represented Indiana University. Their head coach was Allan Williford, who was in his first and only year. The team played its home games at the Old Assembly Hall in Bloomington, Indiana, and was a member of the Western Conference.

The Hoosiers finished the regular season with an overall record of 6–7 and a conference record of 3–5, finishing 5th in the Western Conference.

== Roster ==
Name	Position	Year	Hometown
Phillip Bowser	C	So.	Syracuse, Indiana
Severin Buschmann	F	Jr.	Indianapolis, Indiana
James Frenzel	F	Sr.	Indianapolis, Indiana
Russell Kirkpatrick	G	Sr.	Rushville, Indiana
Allen Maxwell	F	Sr.	Indianapolis, Indiana
DeWitt Mullett	G	Jr.	Columbia City, Indiana
Cleon Nafe	F	Jr.	Rochester, Indiana
William Nash	C	Jr.	Brazil, Indiana
John Porter	F	Sr.	Lebanon, Indiana
Clinton Prather	F	Sr.	Wheatland, Indiana
Frank Whitaker	G	Sr.	South Bend, Indiana

== Schedule/results ==
Date time, TV	Rank^{#}	Opponent^{#}	Result	Record	Site city, state
Regular season
1/8/1916*		Franklin College	W 33–17	1–0	Old Assembly Hall; Bloomington, IN
1/11/1916*		Wabash	L 18–33	1–1	Old Assembly Hall; Bloomington, IN
1/15/1916		at Purdue; Rivalry	L 17–26	1–2 (0–1)	Memorial Gymnasium; West Lafayette, IN
1/25/1916*		at DePauw	W 37–5	2–2 (0–1)	Greencastle, IN
2/9/1916*		at Earlham	W 30–18	3–2 (0–1)	Richmond, IN
2/12/1916		Ohio State	W 26–17	4–2 (1–1)	Old Assembly Hall; Bloomington, IN
2/14/1916		Minnesota	L 20–29	4–3 (1–2)	Old Assembly Hall; Bloomington, IN
2/19/1916		Northwestern	L 26–40	4–4 (1–3)	Old Assembly Hall; Bloomington, IN
2/22/1916		at Ohio State	W 29–26	5–4 (2–3)	Columbus, OH
2/28/1916		at Northwestern	L 20–38	5–5 (2–4)	Old Patten Gymnasium; Evanston, IL
2/29/1916		at Minnesota	L 20–27	5–6 (2–5)	UM Armory; Minneapolis, MN
3/4/1916*		vs. Wabash	L 25–30	5–7 (2–5)	
3/11/1916		Purdue; Rivalry	W 39–29	6–7 (3–5)	Men's Gymnasium; Bloomington, IN
*Non-conference game. ^{#}Rankings from AP Poll. (#) Tournament seedings in parentheses.
