= 1911–12 Wisconsin Badgers men's basketball team =

American college basketball season

1911–12 Wisconsin Badgers men's basketball
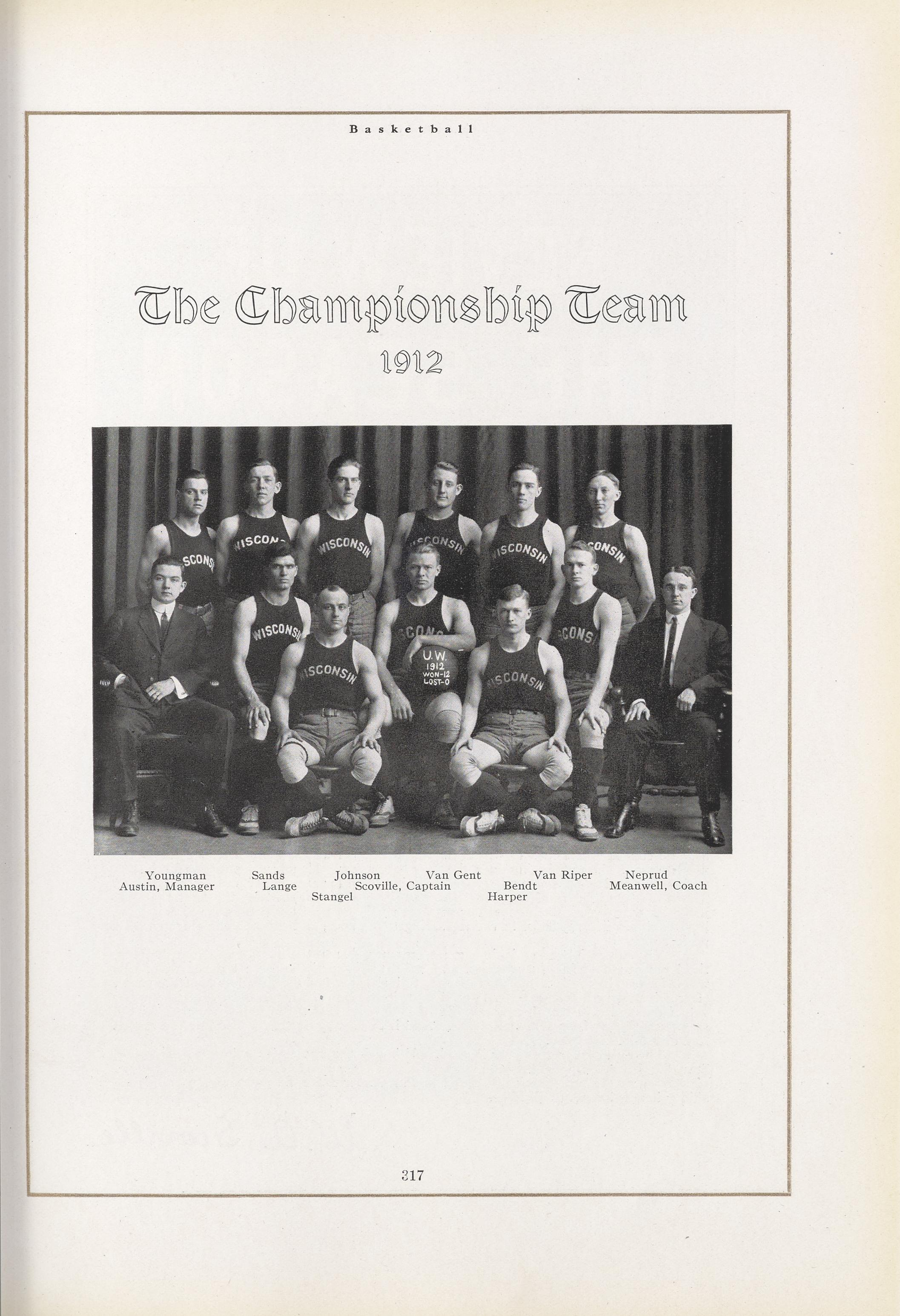

Helms Foundation National Champions Western Conference Champions
- Conference: Big Ten Conference
- Record: 15–0 (12–0 Big Ten)
- Head coach: Walter Meanwell
- Home arena: Red Gym

1911–12 Western Conference men's basketball standings
	Conf.				Overall
Team	W		L	PCT	W		L	PCT
Wisconsin†	12	–	0	1.000	15	–	0	1.000
Purdue†	10	–	0	1.000	12	–	0	1.000
Chicago	7	–	5	.583	12	–	6	.667
Minnesota	6	–	6	.500	7	–	6	.538
Illinois	4	–	8	.333	8	–	8	.500
Indiana	2	–	9	.182	6	–	11	.353
Iowa	0	–	4	.000	6	–	8	.429
Northwestern	0	–	8	.000	4	–	9	.308
Ohio State	0	–	0	–	7	–	5	.583
† Conference co-championship winner

The 1911–12 Wisconsin Badgers men's basketball team represented University of Wisconsin–Madison. The head coach was Walter Meanwell, coaching his first season with the Badgers. The team played their home games at the Red Gym in Madison, Wisconsin and was a member of the Western Conference. The team finished the season with a 15–0 record and won the Western Conference. The team was retroactively named the national champion by the Helms Athletic Foundation and was retroactively listed as the season's top team by the Premo-Porretta Power Poll.

== Schedule ==
Date time, TV	Rank^{#}	Opponent^{#}	Result	Record	Site city, state
Regular Season
12/09/1911*		Beloit (WI)	W 31–18	1–0	Red Gym; Madison, WI
12/16/1911*		Ripon (WI)	W 54–13	2–0	Red Gym; Madison, WI
12/20/1911*		at Beloit (WI)	W 20–12	3–0	Beloit, WI
1/05/1912		at Iowa	W 38–12	4–0 (1–0)	Iowa Armory; Iowa City, IA
1/06/1912		at Northwestern	W 32–19	5–0 (2–0)	Patten Gymnasium; Evanston, IL
1/13/1912		Illinois	W 27–10	6–0 (3–0)	Red Gym; Madison, WI
1/20/1912		Minnesota	W 22–12	7–0 (4–0)	Red Gym; Madison, WI
1/27/1912		at Chicago	W 18–15	8–0 (5–0)	Bartlett Gymnasium; Chicago, IL
2/12/1912		Iowa	W 30–5	9–0 (6–0)	Red Gym; Madison, WI
2/17/1912		Indiana	W 51–10	10–0 (7–0)	Red Gym; Madison, WI
2/24/1912		Northwestern	W 46–11	11–0 (8–0)	Red Gym; Madison, WI
3/02/1912		Chicago	W 34–24	12–0 (9–0)	Red Gym; Madison, WI
3/09/1912		at Minnesota	W 29–26 ^{OT}	13–0 (10–0)	Minnesota Armory; Minneapolis, MN
3/15/1912		at Illinois	W 23–15	14–0 (11–0)	Kenney Gym; Urbana, IL
3/16/1912		at Indiana	W 32–21	15–0 (12–0)	Men's Gymnasium; Bloomington, IN
*Non-conference game. ^{#}Rankings from AP Poll. (#) Tournament seedings in parentheses.
