= 1907–08 Indiana Hoosiers men's basketball team =

American college basketball season

1907–08 Indiana Hoosiers men's basketball
- Conference: Big Ten Conference
- Record: 9–6 (2–4 Western)
- Head coach: Ed Cook (1st season)
- Captains: Edmund Cook; Harlan McCoy; Frank Thompson
- Home arena: Old Assembly Hall

1907–08 Western Conference men's basketball standings
	Conf.				Overall
Team	W		L	PCT	W		L	PCT
Chicago†	7	–	1	.875	23	–	2	.920
Wisconsin	7	–	1	.875	10	–	2	.833
Illinois	6	–	5	.545	20	–	6	.769
Minnesota	2	–	6	.250	12	–	7	.632
Purdue	0	–	8	.000	5	–	9	.357
Iowa	-	–	-	–	10	–	6	.625
Indiana	-	–	-	–	9	–	6	.600
Northwestern	-	–	-	–	2	–	7	.222
† Tie-breaker playoff game winner

The 1907–08 Indiana Hoosiers men's basketball team represented Indiana University. Their head coach was Ed Cook, who was in his first and only year. The team played its home games at the Old Assembly Hall in Bloomington, Indiana, and was a member of the Western Conference.

The Hoosiers finished the regular season with an overall record of 9–6 and a conference record of 2–4, finishing 4th in the Western Conference.

== Roster ==
Name	Position	Year	Hometown
Arthur Berndt	G	Fr.	Indianapolis, Indiana
Cecil Boyle	F	N/A	Shoals, Indiana
Clarence Cartwright	G	N/A	New Harmony, Indiana
Clyde Chattin	F	So.	Shoals, Indiana
Edmund Cook	F	N/A	Indianapolis, Indiana
James Kessler	F	Sr.	Portland, Indiana
Robert Martin	C	N/A	Dana, Indiana
Harlan McCoy	F	Sr.	Chrisney, Indiana
Arthur Rogers	C	So.	Washington, Indiana
Frank Thompson	G	Jr.	Winchester, Indiana
George Trimble	G	Jr.	Evansville, Indiana
Clifford Woody	F	Sr.	Thorntown, Indiana

== Schedule/results ==
Date time, TV	Rank^{#}	Opponent^{#}	Result	Record	Site city, state
Regular season
12/10/1907*		at Marion Athletic Club	W 31–30	1–0	Marion, IN
1/10/1908		at Chicago	L 18–49	1–1 (0–1)	Bartlett Gymnasium; Chicago, IL
1/11/1908		at Northwestern	L 18–21	1–2 (0–2)	Evanston, IL
1/18/1908*		Indiana State	W 37–13	2–2 (0–2)	Old Assembly Hall; Bloomington, IN
1/25/1908		at Illinois; Rivalry	L 12–39	2–3 (0–3)	Kenney Gym; Urbana, IL
1/28/1908*		DePauw	W 25–4	3–3 (0–3)	Old Assembly Hall; Bloomington, IN
1/31/1908		Northwestern	W 36–10	4–3 (1–3)	Old Assembly Hall; Bloomington, IN
2/3/1908*		Rose Poly	W 30–11	5–3 (1–3)	Old Assembly Hall; Bloomington, IN
2/7/1908		at Purdue; Rivalry	W 26–21	6–3 (2–3)	Lafayette Coliseum; West Lafayette, IN
2/11/1908*		at DePauw	W 33–11	7–3 (2–3)	Greencastle, IN
2/15/1908*		at Marion Athletic Club	L 17–28	7–4 (2–3)	Marion, IN
2/19/1908*		Notre Dame	L 20–21	7–5 (2–3)	Old Assembly Hall; Bloomington, IN
2/21/1908*		at Indiana State	W 28–10	8–5 (2–3)	North Hall; Terre Haute, IN
2/23/1908*		at Rose Poly	W 33–19	9–5 (2–3)	Terre Haute, IN
2/26/1908		Purdue; Rivalry	L 14–16	9–6 (2–4)	Old Assembly Hall; Bloomington, IN
*Non-conference game. ^{#}Rankings from AP Poll. (#) Tournament seedings in parentheses.
