= 1910–11 Indiana Hoosiers men's basketball team =

American college basketball season

1910–11 Indiana Hoosiers men's basketball
- Conference: Big Ten Conference
- Record: 11–5 (5–5 Western)
- Head coach: Oscar Rackle (1st season)
- Captain: William Hipskind
- Home arena: Old Assembly Hall

1910–11 Western Conference men's basketball standings
	Conf.				Overall
Team	W		L	PCT	W		L	PCT
Purdue	8	–	4	.667	12	–	4	.750
Minnesota	8	–	4	.667	10	–	4	.714
Chicago	7	–	5	.583	10	–	4	.714
Illinois	6	–	5	.545	6	–	6	.500
Wisconsin	6	–	6	.500	6	–	6	.500
Indiana	5	–	5	.500	11	–	5	.688
Iowa	2	–	2	.500	9	–	4	.692
Northwestern	1	–	12	.077	4	–	15	.211

The 1910–11 Indiana Hoosiers men's basketball team represented Indiana University. Their head coach was Oscar Rackle, who was in his first and only year. The team played its home games at the Old Assembly Hall in Bloomington, Indiana, and was a member of the Western Conference.

The Hoosiers finished the regular season with an overall record of 11–5 and a conference record of 5–5, finishing 6th in the Western Conference.

== Roster ==
Name	Position	Year	Hometown
Dean Barnhart	F	Sr.	Rochester, Indiana
Arthur Berndt	G	Sr.	Indianapolis, Indiana
Merrill Davis	G	Jr.	Marion, Indiana
Haynes Freeland	F	So.	Indianapolis, Indiana
Phil Graves	C	Jr.	Orleans, Indiana
William Hipskind	F	Sr.	Wabash, Indiana
Glen Munkelt	F	So.	Salem, Indiana
Chester Stayton	G	N/A	Mooresville, Indiana
Roscoe Stotter	G	N/A	Forest, Indiana
Claude Whitney	F	N/A	Muncie, Indiana

== Schedule/results ==
Date time, TV	Rank^{#}	Opponent^{#}	Result	Record	Site city, state
Regular season
1/8/1911		at Illinois; Rivalry	L 22–33	0–1 (0–1)	Kenney Gym; Urbana, IL
1/11/1911*		Butler	W 41–16	1–1 (0–1)	Old Assembly Hall; Bloomington, IN
1/14/1911*		at DePauw	W 45–20	2–1 (0–1)	Greencastle, IN
1/21/1911		Chicago	W 22–14	3–1 (1–1)	Old Assembly Hall; Bloomington, IN
1/28/1911*		Rose Poly	W 45–6	4–1 (1–1)	Old Assembly Hall; Bloomington, IN
1/31/1911		Purdue; Rivalry	L 33–37	4–2 (1–2)	Old Assembly Hall; Bloomington, IN
2/3/1911		at Wisconsin	L 9–51	4–3 (1–3)	Red Gym; Madison, WI
2/4/1911		at Chicago	L 17–33	4–4 (1–4)	Bartlett Gymnasium; Chicago, IL
2/10/1911*		at Earlham	W 22–15	5–4 (1–4)	Richmond, IN
2/12/1911		Illinois; Rivalry	W 19–14	6–4 (2–4)	Old Assembly Hall; Bloomington, IN
2/14/1911*		DePauw	W 41–9	7–4 (2–4)	Old Assembly Hall; Bloomington, IN
2/24/1911		at Northwestern	W 33–19	8–4 (3–4)	Old Patten Gymnasium; Evanston, IL
2/25/1911*		at Rose Poly	W 37–24	9–4 (3–4)	Terre Haute, IN
3/4/1911		at Purdue; Rivalry	L 16–21	9–5 (3–5)	Memorial Gymnasium; West Lafayette, IN
3/10/1911		Wisconsin	W 21–18	10–5 (4–5)	Old Assembly Hall; Bloomington, IN
3/11/1911		Northwestern	W 41–12	11–5 (5–5)	Old Assembly Hall; Bloomington, IN
*Non-conference game. ^{#}Rankings from AP Poll. (#) Tournament seedings in parentheses.
