= 1912–13 Georgia Bulldogs basketball team =

American college basketball season

1912–13 Georgia Bulldogs basketball
- Conference: Southern Intercollegiate Athletic Association
- Record: 10–1 (7–0 SIAA)
- Head coach: Howell Peacock (1st season)
- Captain: D. W. Johnston
- Home arena: Memorial Hall

The 1912–13 Georgia Bulldogs basketball team represented the University of Georgia as a member of the Southern Intercollegiate Athletic Association (SIAA) during the 1912–13 NCAA men's basketball season. Led by first-year head coach Howell Peacock, the Bulldogs compiled an overall record of 10–1 with a mark of 7–0 in conference play. The team captain was D. W. Johnston.

== Schedule ==
Date time, TV	Opponent	Result	Record	Site city, state
1/10*	Auburn	W 92–12	1–0	Memorial Hall; Athens, GA
1/17*	at Tennessee	W 52–22	2–0	Knoxville, Tennessee
1/18*	at Maryville	W 69–30	3–0	
1/20*	at A.A.C.	L 28–67	3–1	
1/23*	at Augusta YMCA	W 57–25	4–1	
2/6*	Tennessee	W 38–13	5–1	Memorial Hall; Athens, GA
2/7*	Clemson	W 77–15	6–1	Memorial Hall; Athens, GA
2/15*	at Ga. Tech	W 71–12	7–1	Athens, GA
2/17*	Wake Forest	W 70–28	8–1	Memorial Hall; Athens, GA
2/28*	Georgia Tech	W 35–20	9–1	Memorial Hall; Athens, GA
3/1*	at Auburn	W 92–12	10–1	The Gymnasium; Auburn, AL
*Non-conference game. (#) Tournament seedings in parentheses.
