= Roy Cook (basketball) =

College basketball player

Personal information
- Born: Rochester, New York

Career information
- High school: Rochester
- College: Mercer

Career history
- 1911-1912: Mercer

Career highlights
- All-Southern (1911); SIAA Champion (1912)

Roy Cook was an All-Southern college basketball player for the Mercer Bears men's basketball team, coached by C. C. Stroud. He came from Rochester, New York. The 1912 Mercer team claims an SIAA championship. He was elected captain of the 1913 team, but did not play. Ray reportedly had a wife and three children but not much else is known about them.
