= 1910–11 Wisconsin Badgers men's basketball team =

American college basketball season

1910–11 Wisconsin Badgers men's basketball
- Conference: Big Ten Conference
- Record: 9–6 (6–6 Western)
- Head coach: Haskell Noyes
- Home arena: Red Gym

1910–11 Western Conference men's basketball standings
	Conf.				Overall
Team	W		L	PCT	W		L	PCT
Purdue	8	–	4	.667	12	–	4	.750
Minnesota	8	–	4	.667	10	–	4	.714
Chicago	7	–	5	.583	10	–	4	.714
Illinois	6	–	5	.545	6	–	6	.500
Wisconsin	6	–	6	.500	6	–	6	.500
Indiana	5	–	5	.500	11	–	5	.688
Iowa	2	–	2	.500	9	–	4	.692
Northwestern	1	–	12	.077	4	–	15	.211

The 1910–11 Wisconsin Badgers men's basketball team represented University of Wisconsin–Madison. The head coach was Haskell Noyes, coaching his third season with the Badgers. The team played their home games at the Red Gym in Madison, Wisconsin and was a member of the Western Conference.

== Schedule ==
Date time, TV	Rank^{#}	Opponent^{#}	Result	Record	Site city, state
Regular Season
12/10/1910*		Beloit (WI)	W 32–9	1–0	Red Gym; Madison, WI
12/17/1910*		Ripon (WI)	W 43–8	2–0	Red Gym; Madison, WI
1/07/1911*		Lawrence (IL)	W 39–9	3–0	Red Gym; Madison, WI
1/13/1911		at Purdue	L 16–34	3–1 (0–1)	Memorial Gymnasium; West Lafayette, IN
1/14/1911		at Northwestern	W 29–9	4–1 (1–1)	Patten Gymnasium; Evanston, IL
1/21/1911		Illinois	W 20–17	5–1 (2–1)	Red Gym; Madison, WI
1/28/1911		Chicago	W 46–22	6–1 (3–1)	Red Gym; Madison, WI
2/03/1911		Indiana	W 51–9	7–1 (4–1)	Red Gym; Madison, WI
2/04/1911		at Minnesota	L 16–17	7–2 (4–2)	Minnesota Armory; Minneapolis, MN
2/24/1911		Purdue	W 45–17	8–2 (5–2)	Red Gym; Madison, WI
3/01/1911		Minnesota	L 13–21	8–3 (5–3)	Red Gym; Madison, WI
3/04/1911		at Chicago	L 22–24	8–4 (5–4)	Bartlett Gymnasium; Chicago, IL
3/08/1911		Northwestern	W 23–11	9–4 (6–4)	Red Gym; Madison, WI
3/10/1911		at Indiana	L 18–21	9–5 (6–5)	Men's Gymnasium; Bloomington, IN
3/11/1911		at Illinois	L 18–21	9–6 (6–6)	Kenney Gym; Urbana, IL
*Non-conference game. ^{#}Rankings from AP Poll. (#) Tournament seedings in parentheses.
