= Allan Williford =

American basketball player and coach (1892–1981)

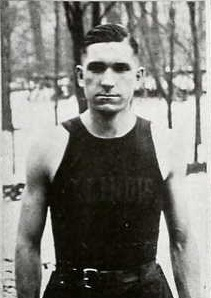
- Williford at Indiana, c. 1915–16 season

Biographical details
- Born: December 22, 1892; Nokomis, Illinois, U.S.
- Died: June 17, 1981 (aged 88); Corpus Christi, Texas, U.S.

Playing career
- 1912–1915: Illinois

Coaching career (HC unless noted)
- 1915–1916: Indiana

Head coaching record
- Overall: 6–7

Accomplishments and honors

Awards
- Big Ten Medal of Honor (1915)

Edward Allan Williford Sr. (December 22, 1892 – June 17, 1981) was an American basketball coach and businessman. He played college basketball at Illinois from 1912 to 1915 and was head coach of the 1915–16 Indiana Hoosiers men's basketball team. He served as a captain in the U.S. Army during World War I and had a long business career, including positions with National Carbon Company, General Aniline & Film, and Link Aviation. He was president of Link Aviation from 1953 to 1958.

== Early years and basketball ==
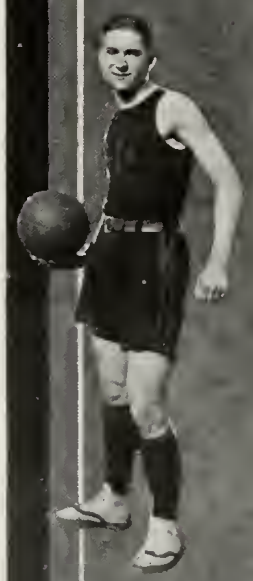
Williford at Illinois, c. 1913

Wiliford was born in 1892 at Nokomis, Illinois, and grew up in East St. Louis, Illinois. He attended the University of Illinois where he received a bachelor of science degree in electrical engineering in 1915. At the University of Illinois, he received three varsity letters, playing at the left forward position for the Fighting illini basketall team as a sophomore, junior, and senior; he was captain of the 1913–14 team. He was also the first recipient at the University of Illinois of the Big Ten Medal of Honor, presented annually to a student who demonstrates proficiency in both scholarship and athletics.

After graduating from Illinois, Williford served as the head coach of the Indiana Hoosiers men's basketball team for its 1915–1916 season, compiling a record of 6–7.

== Military and business career ==
Williford served as a captain in the U.S. Army during World War I. After the war, Williford worked from 1920 to 1944 for the National Carbon Company, rising to become the general sales manager of the carbon products division. From 1945 to 1949, he was vice president of General Aniline & Film and general manager of its Ansco Division in Binghamton, New York. He joined Link Aviation in 1950 and served as its president from 1953 to 1958. In the era following World War II, Link Aviation became the largest manufacturer of electronic weapon-systems trainers and flight and space-mission simulators.

Williford was also active in Binghamton community organizations, including posts as vice president of the Binghamton Chamber of Commerce, a trustee of the Broome County Technical Institute and the First Baptist Church of Binghamton, a director of the Sheltered Workshop of Binghamton, Broome County United Fund, and Associated Industries of New York State.

== Family and later years ==
Williford and his wife Enid had a son E. Allan Williford Jr., and two daughters, Betty and Enid. In retirement, Williford moved to Corpus Christi, Texas, in 1958. He participated in many civic, business, and professional organizations in Corpus Christi. He died in Corpus Christi in 1981 at age 88.
