= James Kase =

American basketball coach

- Kase from The Arbutus, 1912

Biographical details
- Born: May 18, 1888; Frost Valley, Pennsylvania, U.S.
- Died: April 17, 1944; Danville, Pennsylvania, U.S.

Coaching career (HC unless noted)
- 1911–1912: Indiana

Head coaching record
- Overall: 6–11

James Abram Kase Sr. (May 18, 1888 – April 17, 1944) was an American athletics administrator and coach. He was director of physical training at Indiana University during the 1910s and head coach of the 1911–12 Indiana Hoosiers men's basketball team.

== Early years ==
Kase was born in 1888 at Frost Valley, Pennsylvania. He attended Bloomsburg State Normal in Pennsylvania and was a graduate of the Chautauqua Physical Education School. He then became the physical director at the Y.M.C.A. in Danville, Pennsylvania, in the late 1900s. He was also captain of the Danville Professionals, a basketball team that won the championship of Pennsylvania for two years.

== Indiana University ==
In November 1910, he was hired by Indiana University as a physical instructor. He coached the wrestling team and the freshman baseball and football teams. He was eventually promoted to director of physical training. He also served as head coach for the 1911–12 Indiana Hoosiers men's basketball team that compiled a 6–11 record. He was also active in Indiana's athletic fraternity, Sigma Delta Psi. He resigned as Indiana's physical director in 1919 to enter into business in Pennsylvania.

== Family and later years ==
Kase lived most of his life in Danville, Pennsylvania. He was married in 1911 to Bertha Cloud. They had a son, James A. Kase Jr., and a daughter, Miriam Frances. In 1942, Kase was employed as a salesman in 40 Pennsylvania counties for the Dr. L. D. Le Gear Medicine Co. He was later employed by the Kennedy Van Saun Corporation. Kase died in April 1944 at age 56 at his home in Danville after being ill with a heart condition for six months.
