= Oscar Rackle =

American basketball player and coach (1882–1970)

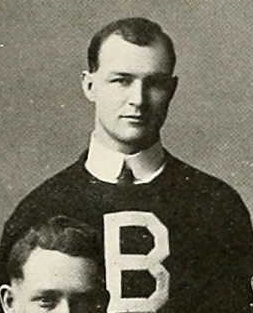
- Rackle from The Arbutus, 1911

Biographical details
- Born: November 28, 1882; Lancaster, Ohio, U.S.
- Died: December 1970 (aged 88); Newport, Rhode Island, U.S.

Playing career
- ?: Brown

Coaching career (HC unless noted)
- 1906: Brown
- 1911: Indiana

Head coaching record
- Overall: 15—12

Oscar William Rackle (November 28, 1882—December 1970) was an American basketball player and coach. He was a multi-sport athlete at Brown University from 1902 to 1906. He later served as head coach of the 1910–11 Indiana Hoosiers men's basketball team.

== Early years ==
Rackle was born in 1882 in Lancaster, Ohio. He was the son of Frederick Rackle and Christina (Betz) "Tina" Rackle. His father was a German immigrant who worked as a stone cutter. He grew up in Lancaster and Canton and attended Canton High School.

== Brown University ==
Rackle attended Brown University. In April 1905, he was elected captain of the Brown Bears men's basketball team; he has also been listed as Brown's coach for the 1905–06 season. At the time, he was "regarded as one of the star basket ball players of the country." While attending Brown, Rackle was known by the nickname "Rack".

In addition to playing basketball, he was a member of the Delta Tau Delta fraternity, quarterback of the 1905 Brown Bears football team, and a member of the varsity track team. The 1906 Brown yearbook noted that Rackle had "succeeded during his college course in demonstrating that athletics and scholarship are by no means incompatible."

== Indiana University ==
Rackle was hired as the coach for the Indiana Hoosiers men's basketball team in December 1910. During the 1910–11 season, he led the Hoosiers to an 11–5 record. The 1911 Indiana yearbook described Rackle's squad as "the best basket ball team [Indiana] has ever had." In December 1911, Rackle advised Indiana that he would not return as coach; he had obtained a mercantile position in New York City that paid better.

== Later years ==
Rackle was married to Mabel Bartlett in Rhode Island in June 1912. As of 1920, Rackle and his wife lived in Providence, Rhode Island, where he was the owner of a tire shop. As of 1932, he continued to live with his wife in Providence and was employed as a salesman of oil heaters. As of 1942, Rackle worked in Newport, Rhode Island for the firm of Ford, Bacon & Davis. Rackle continued to live in Providence until he died. He died in 1970 and left his estate to Brown University for the creation of the Oscar W. Rackle and Mabel Bartlett Rackle Memorial Scholarship Fund.
