= Walter Dubard =

American basketball player (1891–1961)

Atlanta Athletic Club
- Position: Center

Personal information
- Born: November 29, 1891 Greenwood, Mississippi
- Died: June 28, 1961 (aged 69) Grenada, Mississippi

Career highlights
- All-Southern (1913, 1914); Southern champion (1914)

Walter Highgate "Hawk" Dubard (November 29, 1891 – June 28, 1961) was an All-Southern basketball player for the Atlanta Athletic Club. Joe Bean said he was the best basketball player he coached. He was also a swimmer and shot-putter. He was born in Greenwood, Mississippi.
