= 1911–12 Mercer Baptists men's basketball team =

American college basketball season

1911–12 Mercer Baptists men's basketball

SIAA champion
- Conference: Southern Intercollegiate Athletic Association
- Record: 14–4 (2–0 SIAA)
- Head coach: Charles C. Stroud (2nd season)

The 1911–12 Mercer Baptists men's basketball team represented Mercer University in the 1911–12 NCAA men's basketball season. It was Mercer's best team to date. The team won the SIAA. The team featured star player Roy Cook.
