= 1907–08 Wisconsin Badgers men's basketball team =

American college basketball season

1907–08 Wisconsin Badgers men's basketball

Western Conference co-champions
- Conference: Big Ten Conference
- Record: 10–2 (7–1 Western)
- Head coach: Emmett Angell
- Home arena: Red Gym

1907–08 Western Conference men's basketball standings
	Conf.				Overall
Team	W		L	PCT	W		L	PCT
Chicago†	7	–	1	.875	23	–	2	.920
Wisconsin	7	–	1	.875	10	–	2	.833
Illinois	6	–	5	.545	20	–	6	.769
Minnesota	2	–	6	.250	12	–	7	.632
Purdue	0	–	8	.000	5	–	9	.357
Iowa	-	–	-	–	10	–	6	.625
Indiana	-	–	-	–	9	–	6	.600
Northwestern	-	–	-	–	2	–	7	.222
† Tie-breaker playoff game winner

The 1907–08 Wisconsin Badgers men's basketball team represented University of Wisconsin–Madison. The head coach was Emmett Angell, coaching his fourth season with the Badgers. The team played their home games at the Red Gym in Madison, Wisconsin and was a member of the Western Conference.

== Schedule ==
Date time, TV	Rank^{#}	Opponent^{#}	Result	Record	Site city, state
Regular Season
12/14/1907*		Beloit (WI)	W 38–13	1–0	Red Gym; Madison, WI
12/20/1907*		Wisconsin Alumni	W 42–22	2–0	Red Gym; Madison, WI
1/17/1908		at Purdue	W 28–24	3–0 (1–0)	Lafayette Colliseum; West Lafayette, IN
1/18/1908		at Illinois	W 28–20	4–0 (2–0)	Kenney Gym; Urbana, IL
1/23/1908		Purdue	W 34–13	5–0 (3–0)	Red Gym; Madison, WI
1/25/1908		Minnesota	W 37–16	6–0 (4–0)	Red Gym; Madison, WI
1/31/1908		Chicago	W 29–17	7–0 (5–0)	Red Gym; Madison, WI
2/28/1908		at Chicago	L 19–24	7–1 (5–1)	Bartlett Gymnasium; Chicago, IL
3/03/1908*		Nebraska	W 34–4	8–1	Red Gym; Madison, WI
3/07/1908		at Minnesota	W 34–14	9–1 (6–1)	Minnesota Armory; Minneapolis, MN
3/09/1908		Illinois	W 27–14	10–1 (7–1)	Red Gym; Madison, WI
3/12/1908		Chicago; Title Playoff Game	L 16–18	10–2	Red Gym; Madison, WI
*Non-conference game. ^{#}Rankings from AP Poll. (#) Tournament seedings in parentheses.
