= Gilbert Ritchie =

Gilbert Ritchie was an athlete for the Birmingham Athletic Club. He was All-Southern in basketball at center and competed in various events in track and field, "all-around champion of the South". He once broke the discus record of the Southern Amateur Athletic Union with a throw of 118 feet 11 inches.
