= Howell Peacock =

American college basketball coach, physician (1889–1962)

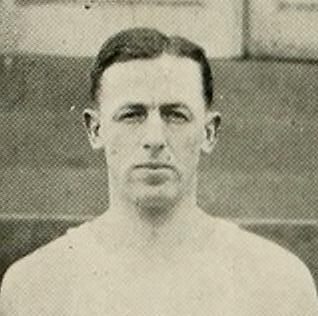
- Peacock pictured in Yackety yak 1918, UNC yearbook

Biographical details
- Born: September 11, 1889; Columbus, Georgia, U.S.
- Died: September 8, 1962 (aged 72); Bala Cynwyd, Pennsylvania, U.S.

Playing career
- 1908: Columbus YMCA
- 1909–1912: Georgia
- Position: Center

Coaching career (HC unless noted)
- 1912–1916: Georgia
- 1916–1919: North Carolina

Accomplishments and honors

Championships
- 2 SIAA (1914, 1916)

Awards
- All-Southern (1910, 1912)

Howell Benajah Peacock (September 11, 1889 – September 8, 1962) was an American basketball coach, best known for being the head coach of men's college basketball at the University of Georgia and the University of North Carolina.

== Playing career ==
Peacock was captain and center for the Southern champion 1908 Columbus YMCA team, then "the cradle of basketball in Georgia." Peacock then played for the Georgia men's basketball team and was team captain for the 1909–10 and 1911–12 seasons. In 1909, continuous dribbling and shots off the dribble were allowed. The 1909 Georgia team did not lose a game against Southern Intercollegiate Athletic Association (SIAA) opponents.

He also played with the Athens YMCA club in 1912 and according to sportswriter Dick Jemison was "by far the best center that ever stepped on a Southern floor". He stood just 5 feet 10 inches.

== Coaching at Georgia ==
After playing on the team, cbecame the head coach for Georgia in 1912 and coached the bulldogs for the next four seasons. Peacock amassed a 30–7 record while coaching for the University of Georgia. The 1914 team won the SIAA and featured Howell's brother Albert Peacock at forward.

== Coaching at North Carolina ==
After leaving the University of Georgia, Peacock became head coach at North Carolina while being simultaneously enrolled as a medical student there. Peacock took over after the departure of Charles Doak as head coach. When Doak left, many of his players also graduated, leaving Peacock to build the team mostly from scratch. In order to field a full team, Peacock recruited players from all over campus by posting signs up, asking men to come and try out for the team. Ten individuals showed up for try-outs and three made it onto the team. The 1916–17 team barely managed to earn a winning record, but did manage to beat Virginia, which was considered a moral victory. The 1916–17 team also included a future Governor of North Carolina Luther H. Hodges and General F. Carlylel Shepard.

The 1917–18 team managed to win all of its home games and became one of the best teams in the South. Peacock's third and final season with the Tar Heels was largely a disappointment, however, as the Tar Heels went 9–7 in the 1918–19 season.

== Medical career and death ==
Howell graduated from Jefferson Medical College in Philadelphia. He practiced medicine at the Pennsylvania Hospital and the Benjamin Franklin Clinic, both located in Philadelphia. Howell died on September 8, 1962, at his home in Bala Cynwyd, Pennsylvania.

== Head coaching record ==
Record table
Season	Team	Overall	Conference	Standing	Postseason
Georgia Bulldogs (Southern Intercollegiate Athletic Association) (1912–1916)
1912–13	Georgia	10–1	7–0		
1913–14	Georgia	9–1	5–0		
1914–15	Georgia	4–3	2–2		
1915–16	Georgia	7–2	2–0		
Georgia:		30–7	16–2		
North Carolina Tar Heels (Independent) (1916–1919)
1916–17	North Carolina	5–4			
1917–18	North Carolina	9–3			
1918–19	North Carolina	9–7			
North Carolina:		23–14			
Total:		53–21			

== Sources ==
1. Powell, Adam (2005). University of North Carolina Basketball. Arcadia Publishing. ISBN 0-7385-4150-8.
2. Rappoport, Ken (2002). Tales from the Tar Heel Locker Room. Sports Publishing LLC. ISBN 1-58261-489-X.
3. "2008-09 North Carolina men's basketball media guide". UNC Athletic Communications. Archived from the original on September 17, 2009.
4. "Dawgs Basketball 2021–22 Media Guide". University of Georgia. 2021.
5. "Orange County, NC - Old Chapel Hill Cemetery, Part 2". usgwarchives.net.
