= Joe Bean =

American baseball player (1874-1961)

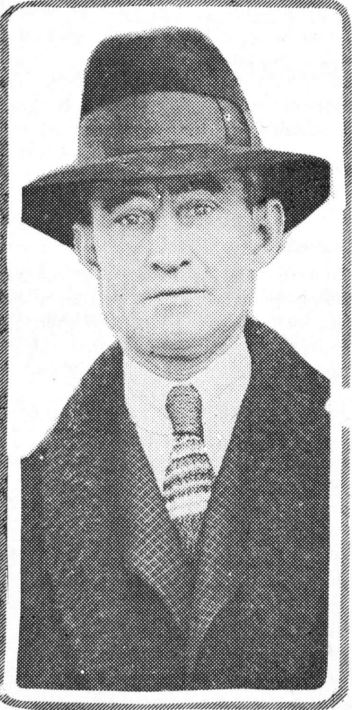
- Bean in 1918
- Shortstop
- Born: March 18, 1874; Boston, Massachusetts, U.S.
- Died: February 15, 1961 (aged 86); Atlanta, Georgia, U.S.
- Batted: Right Threw: Right

MLB debut
- April 28, 1902, for the New York Giants

Last MLB appearance
- June 30, 1902, for the New York Giants

MLB statistics
- Batting average: .220
- Home runs: 0
- Runs batted in: 5
- Stats at Baseball Reference

Teams
- New York Giants (1902)

Joseph William Bean (March 18, 1874 – February 15, 1961) was an American shortstop in Major League Baseball. He played for the New York Giants in 1902. He also coached the Atlanta Athletic Club basketball team, helping to introduce basketball to the South. The team won Southern basketball championships, beginning in 1914 when the team defeated Columbus YMCA.

== Career ==
In 1902, Bean spent less than half a season in the major leagues with the Giants. In that time he played 50 games, but he committed 32 errors and he was released from the team in July when John McGraw was named player-manager of the Giants. Twenty-one players had committed more errors than Bean did in 1902, but nineteen of those players had appeared in at least 100 games that season.

After his lone season in the major leagues, Bean returned to the minor leagues and played there through 1909. He also became the baseball coach at Marist College in Atlanta. In 1904, he converted one of his players, Ed Lafitte, from catcher to pitcher. Lafitte later pitched in the major leagues for several years. Bean succeeded John Heisman as the coach of the Georgia Tech Yellow Jackets baseball team and served in that role between 1918 and 1920. He also coached the school's basketball team in 1921.
