= Fletcher Lane =

College basketball coach

- Fletcher Lane

Biographical details
- Born: January 10, 1875; Hernando, Mississippi, U.S.
- Died: August 12, 1949 (aged 74); Waco, Texas, U.S.

Coaching career (HC unless noted)
- 1907–1908: Illinois

Head coaching record
- Overall: 20–6

Fletcher Lane was an American college basketball coach for the University of Illinois from 1907 to 1908. Lane coached the Fighting Illini to a record of 20–6 with a Western Conference record of 6–5. Even though he led his team to a positive record, the university, as well as the athletes, deemed Lane's coaching style as subpar. Lane's team benefited from a long Southern trip in which the team beat several YMCA and club teams from Tennessee, Texas, Alabama, and Georgia.

== Personal life ==
Lane was born in Hernando, Mississippi, on January 10, 1875. He attended the University of Nebraska and received a degree in physical education in 1905. Lane married Bertha Wiltamuth and had one child, Edward Neil Wiltamuth Lane (b. 1909), however, the couple's marriage ended in divorce. While at the University of Illinois he began taking law classes and became a founding member of the Sigma Pi fraternity chapter there. He would eventually earn his LL.B. degree from the University of Texas in 1910 and his Master of Arts in 1923. He was a World War I veteran and had a primary occupation of teacher for all of his adult life. Lane died on July 12, 1949, in Waco, Texas, and is buried in Oakwood Cemetery.
