= Thomas E. Thompson =

American basketball coach

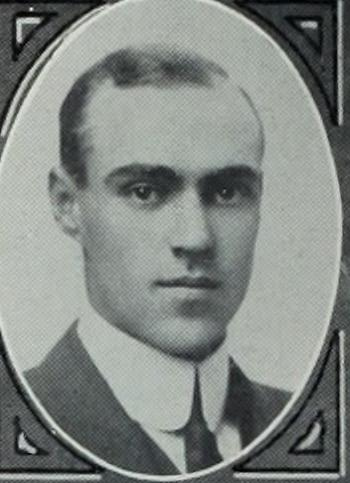

Biographical details
- Born: September 13, 1885; Chicago, Illinois, U.S.

Playing career
- 1906–1910: Illinois

Coaching career (HC unless noted)
- 1910–1912: Illinois

Head coaching record
- Overall: 14–14

Thomas Eugene Thompson was an American college basketball coach for the University of Illinois from 1910 to 1912. Thompson coached the Fighting Illini to a record of 14 wins and 14 losses with a Western Conference record of 10 wins and 13 losses. After playing for the Fighting Illini from 1906 to 1910, Thompson relieved his coach, Herb Juul as head coach. Thompson's teams included players from across the United States, some as far away as California, New Mexico and Nevada. In addition to his duties as basketball coach at Illinois in 1911–12, he also served as athletic director George Huff’s only assistant in the athletic department, doubling as the school's general manager of athletics and as ticket manager.

== Controversy ==
Thompson claimed, at the time, to be the only player in Western Conference history to have played five years of collegiate basketball. He was at Northwestern University for one year before playing at Illinois for four additional seasons.

== Personal life ==
The son of Thomas C. and Selina (Marlow) Thompson, Thomas Eugene Thompson attended New Trier High School, graduating in 1904. He continued his education by attending Northwestern University for one year followed by completing his undergraduate work at the University of Illinois and graduating in 1910 with a Bachelor of Science degree in chemistry. After leaving the coaching ranks, he founded The Thomas C. Thompson Company in Highland Park, Illinois, a manufacturer of enamel products.
