= Tippo Peddy =

American basketball player

Columbus YMCA
- Position: Forward

Personal information
- Born: October 2, 1890 Columbus, Georgia, US
- Died: October 23, 1957 (aged 67) Columbus, Georgia, US
- Listed height: 5 ft 6 in (1.68 m)
- Listed weight: 130 lb (59 kg)

Career history
- 1908-10: Columbus YMCA
- 1912-?: Columbus YMCA

Career highlights
- Southern Champion (1908, 1910); All-Southern (1910, 1913, 1914); Chattahoochee Valley Sports Hall of Fame

Tipton Wiley "Tippo" Peddy (October 2, 1890 – October 23, 1957) was a basketball player for the Columbus YMCA, "the cradle of basketball in Georgia." He was so fast on the floor he was called the "Ty Cobb of basketball." In 1910 he was "without a doubt the best forward in the South". He was selected All-Southern as a basketball player in 1914. In 1919, Peddy scored 53 points in an 83 to 7 win over Camp Benning.

Peddy became the physical director of the YMCA and later was its oldest member. Peddy was inducted into the Chattahoochee Valley Sports Hall of Fame in 2025.
