= YMCA (Columbus, Georgia) =

- Y.M.C.A.
- U.S. National Register of Historic Places
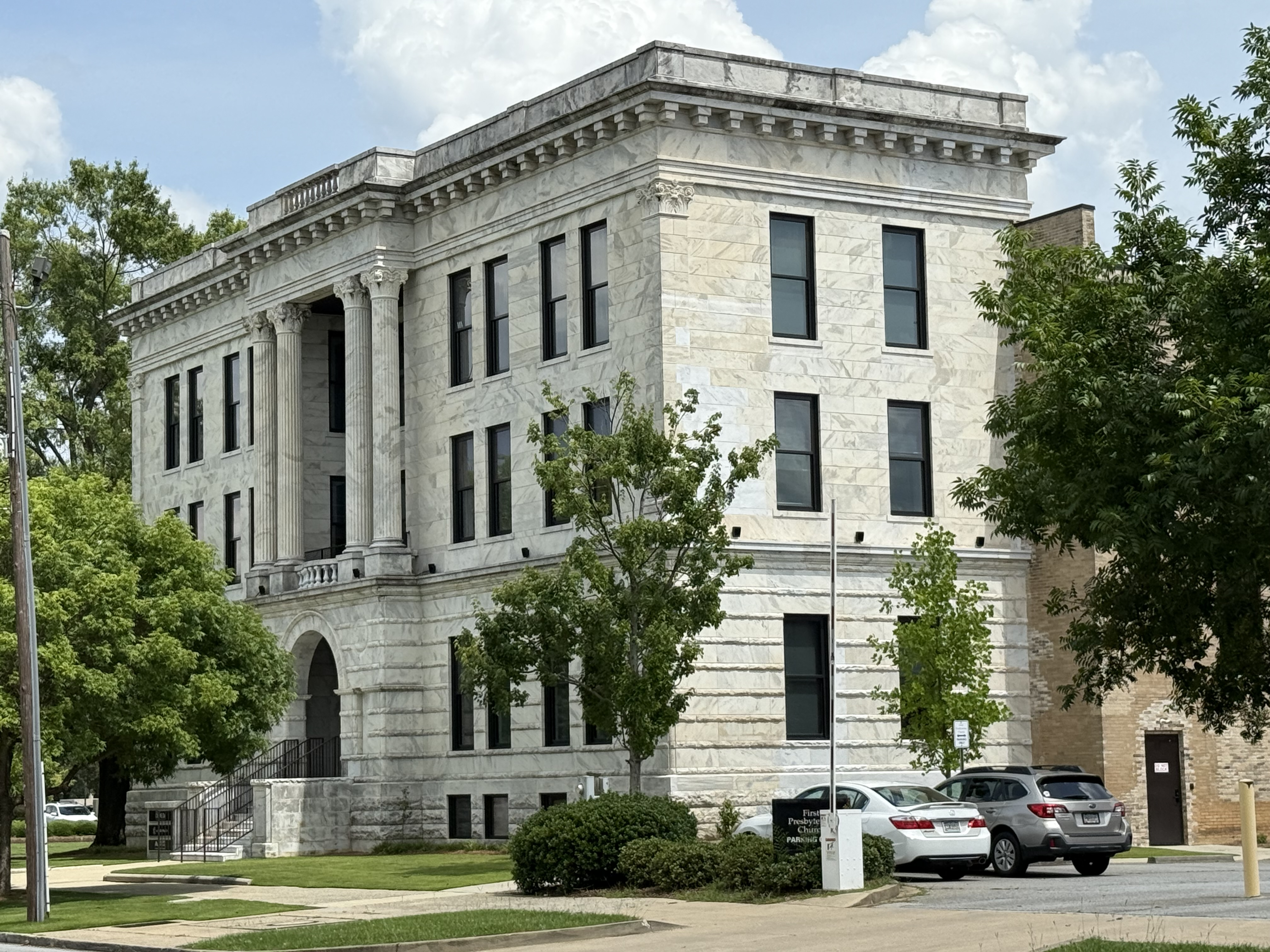
- The building in 2025

- Location within Georgia
- Location: 124 11th St. Columbus, Georgia
- Coordinates: 32°27′59″N 84°59′27″W
- Area: less than one acre
- Built: 1903
- Architectural style: Classical Revival
- MPS: Columbus MRA
- NRHP reference No.: 80001214
- Added to NRHP: September 29, 1980

YMCA in Columbus, Georgia, located at 124 11th St., was built in 1903. It was listed on the National Register of Historic Places in 1980.

It is a building of YMCA of Metropolitan Columbus. It is a three-story building, Classical Revival in style.

It was funded by donation from George Foster Peabody and was believed to be the only marble YMCA building in America.

The Columbus YMCA was once "the cradle of basketball in Georgia." The 1908 Columbus YMCA team claimed a Southern championship. Tippo Peddy played for the team.
