= Basketball positions =

Positions played in basketball

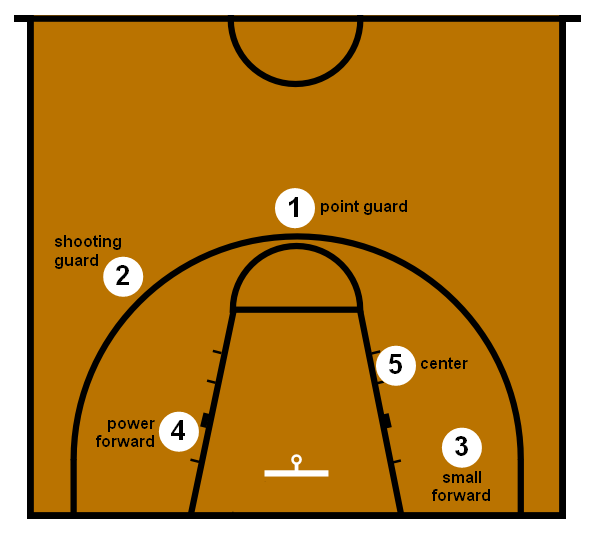
Basketball positions with the numbers as they are known: 1–Point guard; 2–Shooting guard; 3–Small forward; 4–Power forward; 5–Center

In basketball, each team has five players on the court at any given time. Each player is assigned to different positions defined by the strategic role they play. There are three types of these positions: guard, forward, and center. A standard lineup consists of two guards, two forwards, and one center. The guard positions may be called the "back-court", while the forwards and center are often called the "front-court".

Over time, as more specialized roles developed, each of the guards and forwards came to be differentiated. Today, each of the five positions is known by a unique name and number: point guard (PG) or 1, the shooting guard (SG) or 2, the small forward (SF) or 3, the power forward (PF) or 4, and the center (C) or 5.

== Guards ==
The guards were originally tasked with guarding the opposing team's forwards, hence the position's name. The guards usually handle the ball, initiate the offensive plays and move the ball around. They also apply defensive pressure in the backcourt.

=== Running guard and stationary guard ===
In the early history of the sport, there was a "running guard" (also called "floor guard" or "up-floor guard) who brought the ball up the court and passed or attacked the basket. There was also a "stationary guard", sometimes called a standing guard or safety guard, who attempted long-range shots and remained behind on offense to defend against opposing shooters, effectively performing the role of a cherry picker before backcourt violation rules were introduced. George Harmon is an example of a running guard. Pie Weaver is an example of a stationary guard.

=== Point guard ===
The point guard (PG) – also known as the one – is typically the team's shortest player and the most adept at ball handling and passing. Point guards are usually quick players who excel at driving to the basket and creating scoring opportunities for themselves and their teammates. Many of their scoring attempts will be from inside the three-point line or at the rim. For higher skilled players, they may sometimes score from outside the key. Good point guards increase team efficiency and generally have a high number of assists. They are often referred to as "playmakers". In the NBA, point guards are mostly between 5 feet 10 inches (1.78 m) and 6 feet 4 inches (1.93 m).

Point guards often have responsibilities that differ significantly from those of the other positions. While the other positions often focus on scoring points, rebounding the ball, and playing defense, successful point guards often focus on executing plays in a way that involves other players, acting as the leader of the whole team. Although NBA teams do not often name captains, point guard Jalen Brunson was named captain of the New York Knicks for the 2024–2025 NBA season for his leadership. As of 2025, eight of the 13 winners of the NBA Twyman–Stokes Teammate of the Year award have been point guards.

With exceptions, point guards in the modern NBA can often be separated into two different categories: a scoring point guard (also known as a lead guard) and a facilitator-type point guard (also known as a passing guard). A scoring point guard usually has the ability to shoot accurately from three-point or mid-range distance. They are often also capable of scoring from near the basket with layups or dunks. They may rely on their smaller size, quicker speed, and dribbling ability gain an advantage over larger defenders. Stephen Curry and Damian Lillard are examples of scoring point guards who use three-point shooting and finesse around the basket to score effectively. Russell Westbrook is a point guard noted for his poor shooting ability but great skill at finishing near the rim with powerful, athletic dunks and layups over larger defenders. A facilitator-type point guard often has a high intuitive understanding of the game, and as such, can plan and execute plays quickly and effectively. In addition, these types of point guards are typically very knowledgable of their team's half court set offense, knowing the correct spots for each player on the court. Chris Paul and Chelsea Gray are examples of facilitator-type point guards.

Some point guards are known for focusing their strategy on defensive skill and ability to impact the offense of opposing teams' forwards and centers despite their smaller size. This skill set is often relegated to role players and specialists, as opposed to starters, although some players including Gary Payton and Marcus Smart have found recognition in the NBA as NBA Defensive Player of the Year winners.

=== Shooting guard ===
The shooting guard (SG)—also known as the two or the off guard—is, along with the small forward, often referred to as a "wing" because of its use in common positioning tactics. Most shooting guards are best at scoring from the three-point line or long-mid range. Before they can get the ball to make the shot, they must work to stay free and clear of defenders while others pass the ball around. Their ability to find open space for themselves is a key aspect of this position. Like all positions, the ability of a shooting guard to communicate efficiently with teammates is of great importance. If teammates do not know when or where a player will be open, they cannot deliver the ball when an opportunity arises. Most of these skills depend on whether the shooting guard is best at shooting, finishing near the rim, defending, or a combination of these.

Throughout the evolution of the game, there have been different types of shooting guards, categorized as offensive threats and defensive guards. Shooting guards usually know their play style and get better at the qualities they are good at over time. Teams use this play style to determine the role of the shooting guard on the court. If the shooting guard focuses more on taking perimeter jump shots, especially three-point shots, by the use of defensive tactics such as screens (and often without much dribbling), then the shooting guard is typically known as a "catch-and-shoot" type of player. Devin Booker fits the catch-and-shoot play style. If the shooting guard emphasizes driving into the lane and scoring at (or around) the basket, then the shooting guard is generally referred to as a "slasher". Dwyane Wade and Michael Jordan were well known for their ability to "slash" into the lane and score around the rim. However, they also had a fair number of mid-range jump shots and three-pointers. These types of shooting guards are known as offensive threats.

If the shooting guard's main priority is to limit or prevent the opposing team's star player (which is usually the opposing shooting guard or other perimeter player), then the shooting guard is a defensive specialist (Tony Allen, for example). Shooting guards with the ability to shoot from the perimeter while limiting the scoring opportunities of the other team's best perimeter player can be referred to as the "3-and-D" type of players. Danny Green is an example of a 3-and-D type of shooting guard. These shooting guards are known as defensive guards.

In the NBA, a shooting guard is generally between 6 feet 2 inches (1.88 m) and 6 feet 7 inches (2.01 m). A player who is both a point guard and a shooting guard is called a combo guard.

== Forwards ==
Forwards were the main scorers of field goals in the early history of the sport. An example is Jack Cobb.

=== Small forward ===
The small forward (SF) – also known as the three – is considered to be the most versatile of the main five basketball positions. Versatility is key for small forwards due to the nature of their role, which resembles that of a shooting guard more often than that of a power forward. This is why the small forward and shooting guard positions are often used interchangeably and referred to as "wings". This position is like the "Swiss Army knife" because skilled players in this position can fill many roles, including scoring, rebounding, handling the ball, passing, and defending.

Small forwards can be an asset to their team for many reasons, including their speed and strength. A common trait among small forwards is an ability to "get to the line" and draw fouls by aggressively attempting plays, layups, or dunks. As such, high free throw accuracy is necessary for small forwards, many of whom record a large portion of their points from the free throw line. Besides being able to drive to the basket, they are also good shooters from long range. Small forwards are often the second-best 3-point shooters on the court (behind the shooting guard). Usually, when remaining stationary on offense, they will remain just inside the 3-point line. Some small forwards have good passing skills, allowing them to assume point guard responsibilities as point forwards. Small forwards are often able to use many different tactics on the court, playing roles such as swingmen and defensive specialists. A small forward under 6 feet 5 inches (1.96 m) may occasionally fill the role of a shooting guard, while a small forward taller than 6 feet 7 inches (2.01 m) might fill the role of a power forward. In the NBA, small forwards usually range from 6 feet 4 inches (1.93 m) to 6 feet 9 inches (2.06 m). Larry Bird and LeBron James are usually regarded as two of the best players to ever play at the small forward spot in the NBA.

=== Power forward ===
The power forward (PF) – also known as the four – often plays a role similar to that of the center. The power forward is often the team's most powerful and dependable scorer, scoring close to the basket or from mid-range jump shots. Power forwards also have to be versatile on both offense and defense, but to a lesser extent than a small forward. Power forwards usually have good footwork, and when on defense can force an opposing player into a bad shot. Some power forwards have become known as stretch fours, extending their shooting range to include more three-pointers. On defense, they require a mix of strength and athleticism, guarding both big players near the basket and faster players farther away. Most power forwards tend to be more versatile than centers, as their position allows them to be part of plays and not always in the low block. A tall power forward over 6 feet 8 inches (2.03 m) can be a forward-center, playing the roles of a power forward and center. A smaller power forward, approximately 6 feet 7 inches (2.01 m), can play combo forward, playing short forward part-time. In the NBA, power forwards usually range from 6 feet 7 inches (2.01 m) to 7 feet 0 inches (2.13 m). Tim Duncan is widely regarded as the greatest power forward of all time.

The power forward is essentially a larger and stronger version of the small forward, though not usually as tall as the center. The power forward is one of the best at rebounding, and with the help of good strategic knowledge, can make good tactical passes from the high or low post areas. Kevin Garnett is an example of an elite playmaking power forward. Rather than playing a physical style, the stretch four specializes in shooting three-pointers and mid-range jump shots (instead of playing at the post), as Dirk Nowitzki did. The stretch four could also be very useful as a "pick-and-pop" screener, especially against the drop coverage defensive technique. For example, if stretch four goes to the perimeter after setting a screen, their defender will most likely not have enough time to close and contest the potential open jump shot if the defender executes drop coverage. Even if the power forward cannot shoot, being a screener can also set up a mismatch for them or their teammates to try to score on the other team's big man if they switch.

== Center ==
The center (C)—also known as the five, the pivot, or the big—typically plays close to the basket (the "low post"). They are usually the tallest players on the floor. Centers usually score "down low", or "in the paint" (near the basket, in the key), but there have been many centers who are good perimeter shooters as well. They are typically skilled at jump balls, rebounding, contesting shots, and setting screens on players. The goal of centers is to create possessions, and, therefore, opportunities to score, by rebounding and trying to stop the other team from scoring in the paint. Because of a center's central role in defense, "shots blocked" is often used as a stat for these players.

In the past, center players were much taller than the other players on the court. Because of this, they were relatively slow, staying near the basket. Today, however, players who play as a center can also be classified as power forwards, dominate opponents with their defensive skills, and shoot from the high post. The development of more fast-paced and athletic play, which calls for less traditional center play and a more up-and-down-the-court play style, has also contributed to the shift over time. In the NBA, they are usually over 6 feet 8 inches (2.03 m) tall.

The presence of a center who can score in the low post (the area closest to the basket) helps to create balance within an offense. Especially if the center has the footwork to do tactical moves (like drop steps and pivots) it can open up the game for their teammates. If it becomes too easy to score from the low post, the center will get double-teamed. This creates an opportunity for open shots by perimeter players as the center will "kick it out", or pass it, to an open perimeter or "wing" player. As perimeter players typically shoot better from long range, this, in turn, may create easier opportunities for a center to score, since defenses often play out closer to the perimeter shooters.

== Positionless basketball ==
Positionless basketball is a tactical approach in which players are expected to perform roles across multiple traditional positions. Rather than assigning players strictly as guards, forwards, or centers, terms using this approach emphasize versatility, ball-handling, shooting, passing, and defensive switching.

An early form of positionless basketball is often credited to Pat Riley and the Showtime Lakers, who won five NBA championships in the 1980s. The team was led by Magic Johnson, a 6 feet 9 inches (2.06 m) tall point guard whose height was closer to that of many forwards of his era. Johnson's ability to initiate the offense at that size challenged the traditional idea that primary ball-handlers had to be smaller guards. Riley's approach also used size, height, and positional mismatches to create difficult defensive assignments for opposing teams.

The concept was later associated with the Chicago Bulls dynasty of the 1990s. General manager Jerry Krause valued players who could fill multiple roles, including Scottie Pippen, who was used as a point forward and could defend several positions. Pippen played alongside Michael Jordan, another versatile wing player, while the Bulls also added players such as Toni Kukoc, Horace Grant, and Dennis Rodman, each of whom contributed positional flexibility in different ways.

In the early 2010s, Lebron James joined the Miami Heat to form the team's "Big Three" with Dwyane Wade and Chris Bosh. The Heat won consecutive championships while using smaller, more versatile lineups. James often functioned as a point forward, while Bosh's perimeter shooting helped space the floor and create driving lanes. Bosh also became important defensively because of his ability to switch onto quicker guards and wings.

=== The Golden State Warriors Splash Brothers era and Three-point Revolution ===
In the mid to late 2010s to early 2020s, the Warriors emerged as one of the NBA's most dominant teams, winning multiple championships in that span. Led by Stephen Curry and Klay Thompson, together known as the "Splash Brothers", the team popularized a "small ball" type of play. Under coach Steve Kerr, they called their strategy the Death Lineup, where the Warriors frequently used a lineup containing Stephen Curry, Klay Thompson, Draymond Green and Andre Iguodala, with Kevin Durant joining later. The strategy emphasized versatility, ball movement, switchable defense, and efficient three-point shooting, contributing to both a highly productive offense and a strong defense anchored by Green. The Warriors’ success is widely regarded as influential in the NBA's shift toward increased three-point shooting and smaller lineups with emphasis on more versatility. Their style of play also affected how many teams approached roster construction and offensive strategy in the following years.

Modern power forwards and centers emphasize perimeter play, including ball-handling and three-point shooting. Defensively, these players are often expected to switch onto more dynamic/quicker guards and more versatile opponents, reflecting the NBA's shift toward a lesser focus on concrete positions in basketball and pace-oriented styles of play.

== See also ==
- Starting lineup
