= 1912–13 NCAA men's basketball season =

Men's collegiate basketball season

- Helms National Champions: Navy (retroactive selection in 1943)
- Player of the Year (Helms): Eddie Calder, St. Lawrence (retroactive selection in 1944)

The 1912–13 NCAA men's basketball season began in December 1912, progressed through the regular season, and concluded in March 1913.

== Season headlines ==
- In February 1943, the Helms Athletic Foundation retroactively selected Navy as its national champion for the 1912–13 season.
- In 1995, the Premo-Porretta Power Poll retroactively selected Navy as its top-ranked team for the 1912–13 season.

== Regular season ==
=== Conferences ===
==== Conference winners ====
Conference	Regular Season Winner	Conference Player of the Year	Conference Tournament	Tournament Venue (City)	Tournament Winner
Eastern Intercollegiate Basketball League	Cornell	None selected	No Tournament		
Missouri Valley Intercollegiate Athletic Association	Nebraska (North) & Kansas (South)	None selected	No Tournament; Nebraska was the conference champion		
Rocky Mountain Athletic Conference	Colorado		No Tournament		
Western Conference	Wisconsin	None selected	No Tournament		

==== Conference standings ====
1912–13 Eastern Intercollegiate Basketball League standings
	Conf.				Overall
Team	W		L	PCT	W		L	PCT
Cornell	7	–	1	.875	11	–	4	.733
Princeton	4	–	4	.500	11	–	9	.550
Columbia	3	–	5	.375	8	–	5	.615
Dartmouth	3	–	5	.375	4	–	8	.333
Penn	3	–	5	.375	6	–	12	.333
Yale		–		–	5	–	7	.417

1912–13 Rocky Mountain Conference standings
	Conf.				Overall
Team	W		L	PCT	W		L	PCT
Colorado	5	–	1	.833	7	–	4	.636
Colorado Mines	4	–	2	.667	5	–	3	.625
Colorado Agricultural	2	–	4	.333	4	–	4	.500
Denver	1	–	5	.167	1	–	5	.167

1912–13 Missouri Valley Intercollegiate Athletic Association men's basketball standings
	Conf.				Overall
Team	W		L	PCT	W		L	PCT
North Division
Nebraska†	10	–	0	1.000	16	–	2	.889
Iowa State	2	–	4	.333	3	–	13	.188
Drake	0	–	6	.000	1	–	7	.125
South Division
Kansas	7	–	3	.700	16	–	6	.727
Missouri	5	–	3	.625	11	–	7	.611
Washington University	0	–	8	.000	4	–	8	.333
† Conference championship winner

1912–13 Western Conference men's basketball standings
	Conf.				Overall
Team	W		L	PCT	W		L	PCT
Wisconsin	11	–	1	.917	14	–	1	.933
Northwestern	7	–	2	.778	14	–	4	.778
Chicago	8	–	4	.667	20	–	6	.769
Purdue	6	–	5	.545	7	–	5	.583
Illinois	7	–	6	.538	10	–	6	.625
Ohio State	4	–	5	.444	13	–	7	.650
Minnesota	2	–	8	.200	3	–	8	.273
Iowa	1	–	5	.167	9	–	13	.409
Indiana	0	–	10	.000	5	–	11	.313

=== Independents ===
A total of 125 college teams played as major independents. Among independents that played at least 10 games, Dayton (11–0), Detroit (13–0), and Grinnell (11–0) were undefeated, and Utah (21–3) finished with the most wins.

1912–13 NCAA men's basketball independents standings
	Conf.				Overall
Team	W		L	PCT	W		L	PCT
California		–		–	2	–	0	1.000
Dayton		–		–	11	–	0	1.000
Detroit		–		–	13	–	0	1.000
Grinnell		–		–	11	–	0	1.000
Navy		–		–	9	–	0	1.000
New Mexico		–		–	6	–	0	1.000
Oklahoma		–		–	8	–	0	1.000
Denison		–		–	13	–	1	.929
Mississippi A&M		–		–	11	–	1	.917
SUNY-Potsdam		–		–	11	–	1	.917
Union (N.Y.)		–		–	11	–	1	.917
Georgia		–		–	10	–	1	.909
North Dakota Agricultural		–		–	9	–	1	.900
William & Mary		–		–	8	–	1	.889
Akron		–		–	7	–	1	.875
Utah		–		–	21	–	3	.875
Wesleyan (Conn.)		–		–	14	–	2	.875
Notre Dame		–		–	13	–	2	.867
Southern California		–		–	13	–	2	.867
Lehigh		–		–	12	–	2	.857
Army		–		–	11	–	2	.846
Catholic		–		–	14	–	3	.824
Allegheny		–		–	9	–	2	.818
Saint Mary's (Calif.)		–		–	4	–	1	.800
Washington State		–		–	15	–	4	.789
Seton Hall		–		–	11	–	3	.786
Bradley		–		–	14	–	4	.778
Kansas State		–		–	14	–	4	.778
Augustana (Ill.)		–		–	12	–	4	.750
Nevada		–		–	3	–	1	.750
North Central		–		–	9	–	3	.750
Washington		–		–	14	–	5	.737
Millikin		–		–	11	–	4	.733
Virginia		–		–	11	–	4	.733
Indiana State		–		–	8	–	3	.727
Penn State		–		–	8	–	3	.727
Syracuse		–		–	8	–	3	.727
St. Lawrence		–		–	12	–	5	.706
Brigham Young		–		–	7	–	3	.700
Canisius		–		–	7	–	3	.700
Tulane		–		–	7	–	3	.700
Grove City		–		–	9	–	4	.692
Washington and Lee		–		–	9	–	4	.692
Georgetown		–		–	11	–	5	.688
St. Joseph's		–		–	11	–	5	.688
Nebraska Wesleyan		–		–	13	–	6	.684
Oregon Agricultural		–		–	15	–	7	.682
Pittsburgh		–		–	15	–	7	.682
Lake Forest		–		–	10	–	5	.667
Loyola (Md.)		–		–	8	–	4	.667
Southwestern (Kan.)		–		–	4	–	2	.667
Texas		–		–	8	–	4	.667
Texas A&M		–		–	4	–	2	.667
VMI		–		–	8	–	4	.667
Wabash		–		–	8	–	4	.667
Carleton		–		–	9	–	5	.643
Clemson		–		–	9	–	5	.643
Tennessee		–		–	9	–	5	.643
Alabama		–		–	7	–	4	.636
Wisconsin–Stevens Point		–		–	7	–	4	.636
Kentucky		–		–	5	–	3	.625
Montana		–		–	5	–	3	.625
Michigan State		–		–	8	–	5	.615
Muhlenberg		–		–	8	–	5	.615
Central Missouri		–		–	11	–	7	.611
Arizona		–		–	3	–	2	.600
Millsaps		–		–	9	–	6	.600
North Dakota		–		–	6	–	4	.600
St. John's (N.Y.)		–		–	12	–	8	.600
Wooster		–		–	6	–	4	.600
Montana State		–		–	7	–	5	.583
Oberlin		–		–	7	–	5	.583
Fordham		–		–	18	–	13	.581
Trinity (N.C.)		–		–	11	–	8	.579
Rhode Island State		–		–	4	–	3	.571
Wake Forest		–		–	9	–	7	.563
Baylor		–		–	5	–	4	.556
Utah State		–		–	5	–	4	.556
Temple		–		–	5	–	4	.556
Hope		–		–	7	–	6	.538
Arizona State–Tempe		–		–	3	–	3	.500
CCNY		–		–	6	–	6	.500
Colgate		–		–	7	–	7	.500
Idaho		–		–	7	–	7	.500
Santa Clara		–		–	5	–	5	.500
Springfield (Mass.)		–		–	4	–	4	.500
Niagara		–		–	9	–	10	.474
Oregon		–		–	9	–	10	.474
Manhattan		–		–	8	–	10	.444
Gettysburg		–		–	7	–	9	.438
Vanderbilt		–		–	3	–	4	.429
Auburn		–		–	6	–	9	.400
LSU		–		–	2	–	3	.400
Louisville		–		–	2	–	3	.400
South Carolina		–		–	2	–	3	.400
Swarthmore		–		–	4	–	6	.400
The Citadel		–		–	2	–	3	.400
Cincinnati		–		–	4	–	7	.364
North Carolina		–		–	4	–	7	.364
Roanoke		–		–	4	–	7	.364
Ohio		–		–	5	–	9	.357
Virginia Tech		–		–	5	–	9	.357
Miami (Ohio)		–		–	4	–	8	.333
Oklahoma A&M		–		–	3	–	6	.333
NC State		–		–	3	–	7	.300
Washington College		–		–	3	–	7	.300
Wyoming		–		–	2	–	5	.286
Butler		–		–	3	–	8	.273
Franklin		–		–	3	–	9	.250
Northern Colorado		–		–	1	–	3	.250
Bucknell		–		–	4	–	13	.235
Washburn		–		–	4	–	14	.222
Kalamazoo		–		–	1	–	4	.200
Delaware		–		–	1	–	6	.143
George Washington		–		–	1	–	6	.143
New Mexico A&M		–		–	1	–	6	.143
Marietta		–		–	1	–	9	.100
Mount Union		–		–	1	–	9	.100
New York University		–		–	1	–	11	.083
Fairmount		–		–	1	–	11	.083
Washington & Jefferson		–		–	1	–	13	.071
Connecticut		–		–	0	–	3	.000
Davidson		–		–	0	–	1	.000
Ole Miss		–		–	0	–	7	.000
Richmond		–		–	0	–	6	.000

== Awards ==
=== Helms College Basketball All-Americans ===
The practice of selecting a Consensus All-American Team did not begin until the 1928–29 season. The Helms Athletic Foundation later retroactively selected a list of All-Americans for the 1912–13 season.

Player	Team
Eddie Calder	St. Lawrence
Sam Carrier	Nebraska
Gil Halstead	Cornell
Edward Hayward	Wesleyan (Conn.)
Allen Johnson	Wisconsin
William Roberts	Army
Hamilton Salmon	Princeton
Alphonse Schumacher	Dayton
Larry Teeple	Purdue
Laurence Wild	Navy

=== Major player of the year awards ===
- Helms Player of the Year: Eddie Calder, St. Lawrence (retroactive selection in 1944)

== Coaching changes ==
A number of teams changed coaches during the season and after it ended.

Team	Former Coach	Interim Coach	New Coach	Reason
Arizona State–Tempe	C. W. Adams		G. W. Henry	
Army	Harvey Higley		Joseph Stilwell	Stilwell's third and final tenure as basketball coach.
Baylor	Ralph Glaze		Norman C. Paine	Paine also became the football coach and athletic director.
Bucknell	H. E. Shaffner		Dwite Shaffner	
The Citadel	J. G. Briggs		Darl Buse	
Clemson	Frank Dobson		John W. Erwin	
Colgate	Ellery Huntington Sr.		Walt Hammond	
Dartmouth	James Mullen		C. A. Reed	
Detroit	Royal R. Campbell		Walter Hardy	
Indiana	Art Powell		Arthur Berndt	Berndt also became the baseball coach.
Iowa	Floyd Thomas		Maury Kent	
Kentucky	John J. Tigert		Alpha Brumage	
Lehigh	Tom Keady		S. E. Muthart	
LSU	F. M. Long		Charles C. Stroud	Stroud also became athletic director and baseball coach.
Manhattan	Fred J. Murphy		Edward Hanrahan	Murphy left to become Northwestern's athletic director.
Miami (OH)	M. Hoskins		A. D. Browne	
Montana State	Earnest Dockstader		Joe Markham	
Navy	Louis Wenzell		Laurence Wild	
NC State	Chuck Sandborn		Jack Hegarty	
Nevada	C. E. Holoway		Silas Ross	
North Dakota	Charles Armstrong		Fred V. Archer	
North Dakota Agricultural	Arthur Rueber		Howard Wood	
Notre Dame	Bill Nelson		Jesse Harper	Harper also became the head football coach and the athletic director.
Ohio	C. M. Douthit		M. B. Banks	
Oregon	Bill Hayward		Hugo Bezdek	
South Carolina	James G. Driver		James Blackburn	
Temple	Frederick Prosch		William Nicholai	
Texas	Carl Taylor		L. Theo Bellmont	
Trinity (N.C.)	Joseph Brinn		Nobel Clay	
Tulane	Appleton A. Mason		Carl Hanson	
Vanderbilt	Oscar G. Nelson		Guy T. Denton	
Virginia Tech	Houston Hughes		Branch Bocock	
VMI	Alpha Brumage		W. C. Raffery	Brumage left VMI to coach at Kentucky.
William & Mary	William J. Young		Dexter W. Draper	
Wyoming	Leon Exelby		Ralph Thacker	
Yale	Pop Foster		Haskell Noyes	
