= 1913 NCAA Men's Basketball All-Americans =

Best college basketball players of 1913

- Awarded for: 1912–13 NCAA men's basketball season

The 1913 College Basketball All-American team, as chosen retroactively by the Helms Athletic Foundation. The player highlighted in gold was chosen as the Helms Foundation College Basketball Player of the Year retroactively in 1944.

Player	Team
Eddie Calder	St. Lawrence
Sam Carrier	Nebraska
Gil Halstead	Cornell
Edward Hayward	Wesleyan (Conn.)
Allen Johnson	Wisconsin
William Roberts	Army
Hamilton Salmon	Princeton
Alphonse Schumacher	Dayton
Larry Teeple	Purdue
Laurence Wild	Navy

== See also ==
- 1912–13 NCAA men's basketball season
