= 1912–13 University of Virginia men's basketball team =

American college basketball season

1912–13 University of Virginia men's basketball
- Conference: South Atlantic Intercollegiate Athletic Association
- Record: 11–4 (4–2 SAIAA)
- Head coach: Henry Lannigan (8th season)
- Home arena: Fayerweather Gymnasium

The 1912–13 University of Virginia men's basketball team represented the University of Virginia during the 1912–13 NCAA men's basketball season. The team was led by eighth-year head coach Henry Lannigan, and played their home games at Fayerweather Gymnasium in Charlottesville, Virginia. Now known as the Virginia Cavaliers, the team did not have an official nickname prior to 1923.

== Schedule ==
| Date time, TV | Opponent | Result | Record | Site city, state |
Regular season
| January 11* no, no | Gallaudet | W 40–12 | 1–0 | Fayerweather Gymnasium; Charlottesville, VA |
| January 17* no, no | Hampden–Sydney | W 35–4 | 2–0 | Fayerweather Gymnasium; Charlottesville, VA |
| January 18* no, no | Randolph–Macon | W 55–12 | 3–0 | Fayerweather Gymnasium; Charlottesville, VA |
| January 24 no, no | Maryland | W 65–1 | 4–0 (1–0) | Fayerweather Gymnasium; Charlottesville, VA |
| January 27 no, no | NC State | W 53–10 | 5–0 (2–0) | Fayerweather Gymnasium; Charlottesville, VA |
| January 30* no, no | VMI | W 39–15 | 6–0 (2–0) | Fayerweather Gymnasium; Charlottesville, VA |
| January 31 no, no | Georgetown | W 22–16 | 7–0 (3–0) | Fayerweather Gymnasium; Charlottesville, VA |
| February 6* no, no | Duke | W 33–11 | 8–0 (3–0) | Fayerweather Gymnasium; Charlottesville, VA |
| February 8 no, no | vs. Washington & Lee | L 28–43 | 8–1 (3–1) | Lynchburg, VA |
| February 10 no, no | vs. North Carolina | W 30–19 | 9–1 (4–1) | Raleigh, NC |
| February 14* no, no | at Catholic | L 31–41 | 9–2 (4–1) | Washington, DC |
| February 15 no, no | at Georgetown | L 19–26 | 9–3 (4–2) | Arcade Rink; Washington, DC |
| February 17* no, no | at St. John's | L 21–37 | 9–4 (4–2) | Annapolis, MD |
| February 18* no, no | at George Washington | W 43–18 | 10–4 (4–2) | Washington, DC |
| February 21–22* no, no | Franklin & Marshall | W 44–28 | 11–4 (4–2) | Fayerweather Gymnasium; Charlottesville, VA |
*Non-conference game. (#) Tournament seedings in parentheses. All times are in Eastern Time.
