= List of Navy Midshipmen men's basketball head coaches =

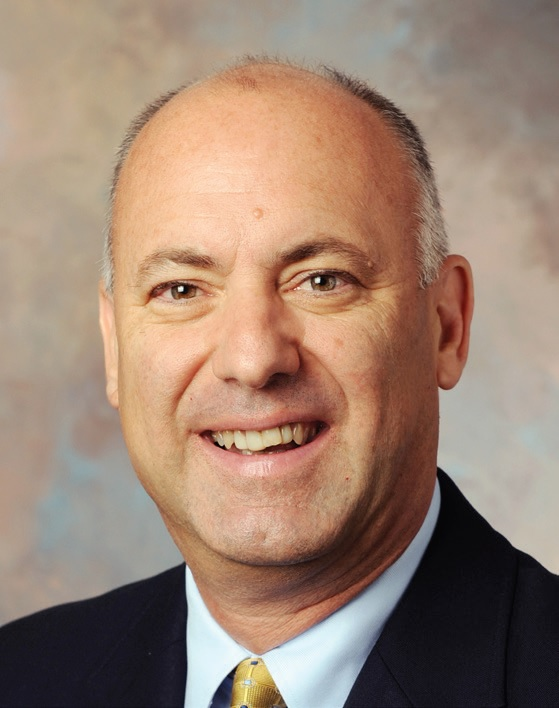
Ed DeChellis, the current head coach of the Midshipmen.

The following is a list of Navy Midshipmen men's basketball head coaches. There have been 19 head coaches of the Midshipmen in their 116-season history.

Navy's current head coach is Ed DeChellis. He was hired as the Midshipmen's head coach in May 2011, replacing Billy Lange, who resigned to join the coaching staff at Villanova.

No.	Tenure	Coach	Years	Record	Pct.
1	1907–1908	Joseph Finneran	1	2–2	.500
2	1908–1910; 1918–1922	Billy Lush	6	82–11	.882
3	1910–1911	Bernard Willis	1	10–1	.909
4	1911–1912	George F. Jacobs	1	8–1	.889
5	1912–1913	Louis Wenzell	1	9–0	1.000
6	1913–1914	Laurence Wild	1	10–0	1.000
7	1914–1915	Albert Cohan	1	9–2	.818
8	1915–1918	James Colliflower	3	37–4	.902
9	1922–1925	James Allen	3	47–12	.797
10	1925–1926	Herb Underwood	1	12–5	.706
11	1926–1946	John Wilson	20	206–94	.687
12	1946–1966	Ben Carnevale	20	257–160	.616
13	1966–1976	Dave Smalley	10	94–130	.420
14	1976–1980	Bob Hamilton	4	54–47	.535
15	1980–1986	Paul Evans	6	119–60	.665
16	1986–1992	Pete Herrmann	6	63–110	.364
17	1992–2004	Don DeVoe	5	85–58	.594
18	2004–2011	Billy Lange	7	93–114	.449
19	2011–present	Ed DeChellis	12	168–193	.465
Totals		19 coaches	116 seasons	1,464–1,107	.569
Records updated through end of 2022–23 season Source
