= 1912–13 Iowa State Cyclones men's basketball team =

American college basketball season

1912–13 Iowa State Cyclones men's basketball
- Conference: Missouri Valley Intercollegiate Athletic Association
- Record: 3–13 (2–4 MVIAA)
- Head coach: Homer Hubbard (2nd season)
- Home arena: State Gymnasium

1912–13 Missouri Valley Intercollegiate Athletic Association men's basketball standings
	Conf.				Overall
Team	W		L	PCT	W		L	PCT
North Division
Nebraska†	10	–	0	1.000	16	–	2	.889
Iowa State	2	–	4	.333	3	–	13	.188
Drake	0	–	6	.000	1	–	7	.125
South Division
Kansas	7	–	3	.700	16	–	6	.727
Missouri	5	–	3	.625	11	–	7	.611
Washington University	0	–	8	.000	4	–	8	.333
† Conference championship winner

The 1912–13 Iowa State Cyclones men's basketball team (also known informally as Ames) represented Iowa State University during the 1912–13 NCAA men's basketball season. The Cyclones were coached by Homer Hubbard, who was in his second season with the Cyclones. This was the inaugural season for the Cyclones at the State Gymnasium in Ames, Iowa.

They finished the season 3–13, 2–4 in Missouri Valley play to finish in second place in the North division.

== Roster ==
1912–13 Iowa State Cyclones men's basketball team
Players
Coaches

Pos.	#	Name	Height	Weight	Year	Hometown
F		Earl Bisbee	—	—
G		Harry Hansel	—	—
G		Gates Harpel	—	—
G		E.S. Miles	—	—
F		F.D. Millar	—	—
G		R.H. Moyer	—	—
C		Hans Pfund (C)	—	—
G		G.P. Prichett	—	—
F		Reuben Rath	—	—
G		Frank Rodgers	—	—
F		A.J. Swift	—	—

Head coach

- Homer Hubbard

Assistant coach(es)

Legend

- (C) Team captain
- (S) Suspended
- (I) Ineligible
- (W) Walk-on
- Injured
- Current redshirt

== Schedule and results ==
Date time, TV	Rank^{#}	Opponent^{#}	Result	Record	Site city, state
Regular season
January 14, 1913*		at Washington (Mo.)	L 21–28	0–1	Francis Gymnasium; St. Louis, Missouri
January 15, 1913*		at Washington (Mo.)	L 15–20	0–2	Francis Gymnasium; St. Louis, Missouri
January 16, 1913*		at Missouri	L 14–28	0–3	Rothwell Gymnasium; Columbia, Missouri
January 17, 1913*		at Missouri	L 13–25	0–4	Rothwell Gymnasium; Columbia, Missouri
January 18, 1913		at Drake; Iowa Big Four	W 11–6	1–4 (1–0)	Alumni Gymnasium; Des Moines, Iowa
February 6, 1913		Drake; Iowa Big Four	W 30–18	2–4 (2–0)	State Gymnasium; Ames, Iowa
February 7, 1913*		at Grinnell	L 11–31	2–5	Grinnell, Iowa
February 8, 1913*		at Iowa; Cy-Hawk Rivalry	L 15–27	2–6	First Iowa Armory; Iowa City, Iowa
February 10, 1913*		Missouri	L 13–33	2–7	State Gymnasium; Ames, Iowa
February 11, 1913*		Missouri	W 24–23	3–7	State Gymnasium; Ames, Iowa
February 11, 1913*		Grinnell	L 3–18	3–8	State Gymnasium; Ames, Iowa
February 21, 1913		Nebraska	L 12–29	3–9 (2–1)	State Gymnasium; Ames, Iowa
February 22, 1913		Nebraska	L 10–16	3–10 (2–2)	State Gymnasium; Ames, Iowa
February 25, 1913*		Iowa; Cy-Hawk Rivalry	L 14–21	3–11	State Gymnasium; Ames, Iowa
February 28, 1913		at Nebraska	L 8–28	3–12 (2–3)	Grant Memorial Hall; Lincoln, Nebraska
March 1, 1913		at Nebraska	L 12–24	3–13 (2–4)	Grant Memorial Hall; Lincoln, Nebraska
*Non-conference game. ^{#}Rankings from AP poll. (#) Tournament seedings in parentheses. All times are in Central Time.
