= Ellery Huntington =

Ellery Huntington may refer to:

- Ellery Huntington Sr. (c. 1865 – 1945), American college athletics coach, administrator, and professor, head basketball coach at Colgate University (1900–1913)
- Ellery Huntington Jr. (1893–1987), American football player and coach, head football coach at Colgate University (1919–1921), College Football Hall of Fame inductee, son of the former
