= David Smalley =

David Smalley may refer to:

- Dave Smalley, American punk musician
- Dave Smalley (pop musician) (born 1949), American musician and former member of 70s power pop group The Raspberries
- Dave Smalley (basketball) (1934–2007), American basketball coach
- David Allen Smalley (1809–1877), U.S. judge in Vermont
