= 1912–13 Navy Midshipmen men's basketball team =

American college basketball season

1912–13 Navy Midshipmen men's basketball
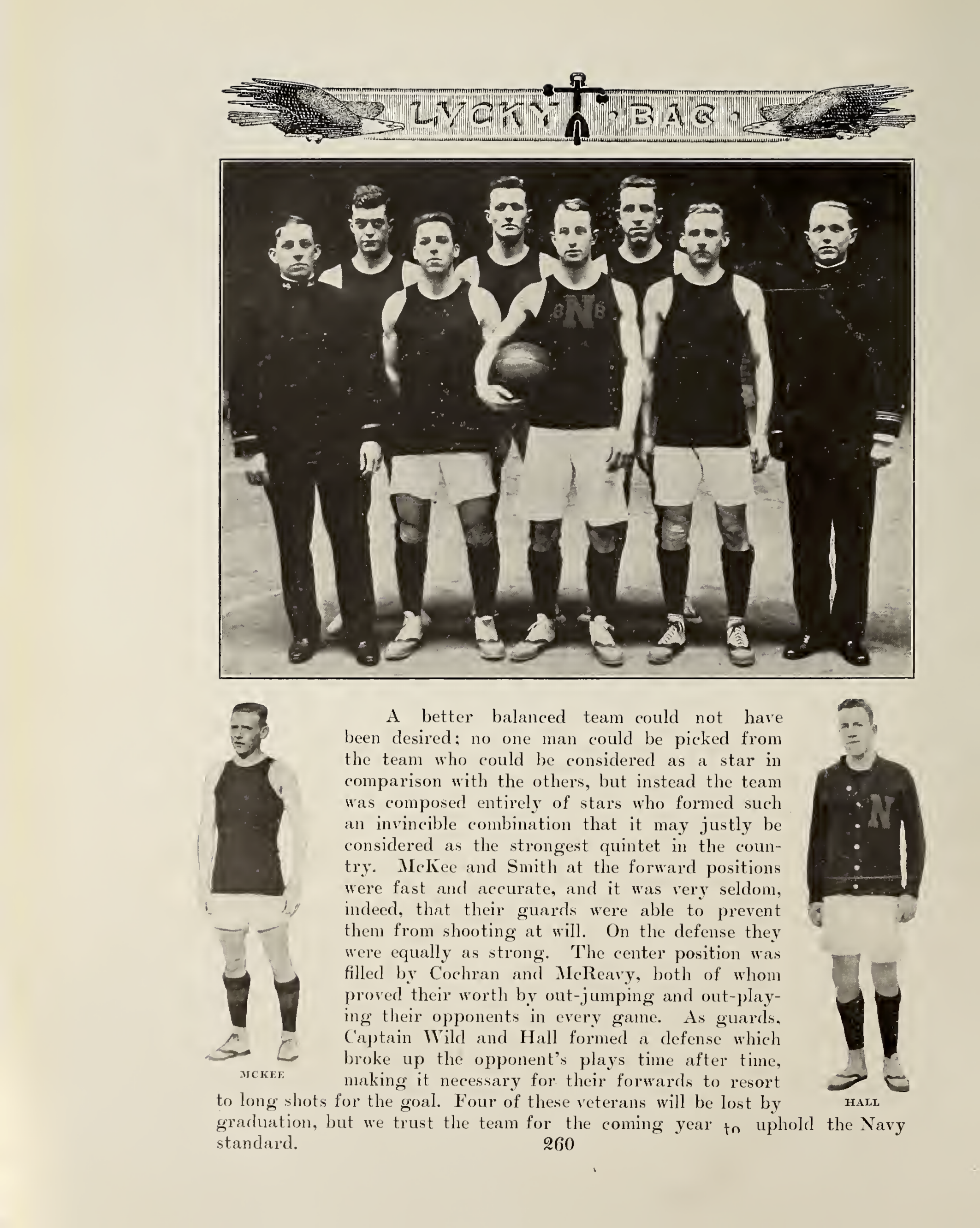

Helms Foundation National Champions Southern Champion
- Conference: Independent
- Record: 9–0
- Head coach: Louis Wenzell (1st season)
- MVP: Laurence Wild
- Captain: Laurence Wild
- Home arena: Halsey Field House

The 1912–13 Navy Midshipmen men's basketball team represented the United States Naval Academy in intercollegiate basketball during the 1912–13 season. The team finished the season with a 9–0 record. The team was retroactively named the 1912–13 national champion by the Helms Athletic Foundation and was retroactively listed as the top team of the season by the Premo-Porretta Power Poll. It was head coach Louis Wenzell's first and only season coaching the team. Player Laurence Wild was named a consensus All-American at the end of the season.

== Schedule ==
Date time, TV	Rank^{#}	Opponent^{#}	Result	Record	Site city, state
Regular season
12/14/1912*		Baltimore Medical College	W 44–22	1–0	
12/21/1912*		Catholic University	W 59–33	2–0	
1/11/1913*		NYU	W 74–18	3–0	
1/18/1913*		St. John's	W 55–30	4–0	
1/25/1913*		Crescent Athletic Club	W 49–7	5–0	
2/1/1913*		Lehigh	W 56–17	6–0	
2/8/1913*		Swarthmore	W 31–12	7–0	
2/15/1913*		St. John's (Maryland)	W 46–30	8–0	
2/22/1913*		Georgetown	W 67–18	9–0	Dahlgren Hall; Annapolis, MD
*Non-conference game. ^{#}Rankings from AP Poll. (#) Tournament seedings in parentheses.
