= 1912–13 Indiana State Sycamores men's basketball team =

American college basketball season

1912–13 Indiana State Sycamores men's basketball
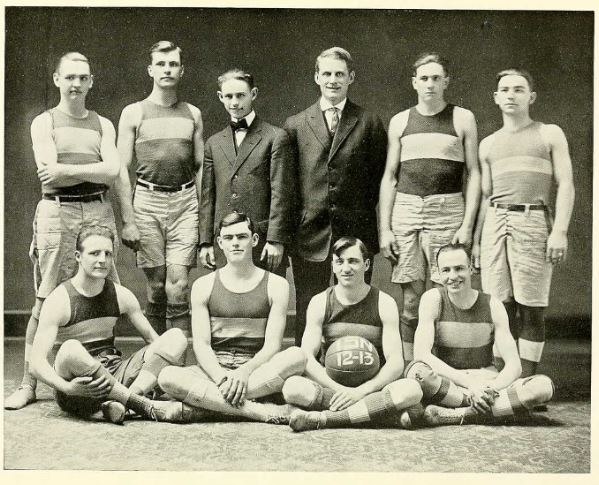
- Conference: Independent
- Record: 8–3
- Head coach: Alfred Westphal (1st season)
- Assistant coach: Wlm. W. Wright (1st season)
- Captain: Jim Clark
- Home arena: North Hall

The 1912–13 Indiana State Sycamores men's basketball team represented Indiana State University during the 1912–13 college men's basketball season. The head coach was Alfred Westphal, coaching the sycamores in his first season. The team played their home games at North Hall in Terre Haute, Indiana.

== Roster ==
The Sycamores were led by Jim Clark, the team Captain. He was followed by Noble Wilson, Dale Stiffler, Henry Knauth, William Unverferth, _ Vermillion, _ Hyndman, _ Johnson, _ Fishback and _ Warren.

== Schedule ==
Date time, TV	Opponent	Result	Record	Site city, state
12/06/1912	Merom Christian	W 25–13	1–0	North Hall; Terre Haute, IN
12/13/1912	Central Normal	W 82–19	2–0	North Hall; Terre Haute, IN
1/10/1913	at DePauw	W 35–31	3–0	Greencastle, IN
1/17/1913	at Butler	W 29–11	4–0	Indianapolis, IN
1/24/1913	at DePauw	W 32–26	5–0	Greencastle, IN
1/31/1913	Butler	W 43–33	6–0	North Hall; Terre Haute, IN
2/08/1913	at Indiana	L 11–26	6–1	Old Assembly Hall; Bloomington, IN
2/12/1913	at Eastern Illinois	W	7–1	Pemberton Hall; Charleston, IL
2/22/1913	at McKendree	L 26–46	7–2	Lebanon, IL
3/07/1913	at Hanover	L 24–30	7–3	Hanover, IN
3/08/1913	at Moores Hill	W 40–22	8–3	Moores Hill, IN
*Non-conference game. (#) Tournament seedings in parentheses.
