= 1912–13 Kansas Jayhawks men's basketball team =

American college basketball season

1912–13 Kansas Jayhawks men's basketball
- Conference: MVIAA
- Record: 16–6 (8–3 MVIAA)
- Head coach: W.O. Hamilton (4th season)
- Captain: Charles Greenless
- Home arena: Robinson Gymnasium

The 1912–13 Kansas Jayhawks men's basketball team represented the University of Kansas during the 1912–13 college men's basketball season, which was their 15th season. They were coached by W. O. Hamilton who was in his 4th year as head coach. They played their home games at Robinson Gymnasium and were members of the MVIAA. The Jayhawks finished the season 16–6.

== Roster ==
- Walter Boehm
- Loren Brown
- Ray Dunmire
- Charles Greenless
- Ora Hite
- Ralph Sproull
- Arthur Weaver

== Schedule and results ==
The schedule below is missing five games. The Jayhawks went 3–2 in the missing games.

Date time, TV	Rank^{#}	Opponent^{#}	Result	Record	Site city, state
January 16*		Haskell Indian Nations	W 56–27	1-0	Robinson Gymnasium; Lawrence, KS
January 17*		Haskell Indian Nations	W 41–25	2-0	Robinson Gymnasium; Lawrence, KS
January 18*		Washburn	W 44–25	3-0	Robinson Gymnasium; Lawrence, KS
January 21		Kansas State; Sunflower Showdown	L 21–39	3-1 (0-1)	Robinson Gymnasium; Lawrence, KS
January 22		Kansas State; Sunflower Showdown	L 25–27	3-2 (0-2)	Robinson Gymnasium; Lawrence, KS
January 30		at Kansas State; Sunflower Showdown	W 34–19	4-2 (1-2)	Nichols Hall; Manhattan, KS
January 31		at Kansas State; Sunflower Showdown	W 30–20	5-2 (2-2)	Nichols Hall; Manhattan, KS
February 1*		at Washburn	L 40–41	5-3	Topeka, KS
February 7		Washington University (MO)	W 44–25	6-3 (3-2)	Robinson Gymnasium; Lawrence, KS
February 8		Washington University (MO)	W 68–8	7-3 (4-2)	Robinson Gymnasium; Lawrence, KS
February 14		Missouri; Border War	W 22–12	8-3 (5-2)	Robinson Gymnasium; Lawrence, KS
February 15		Missouri; Border War	W 34–20	9-3 (6-2)	Robinson Gymnasium; Lawrence, KS
February 19*		William Jewel	W 47–19	10-3	Robinson Gymnasium; Lawrence, KS
February 22*		College of Emporia	W 41–29	11-3	Robinson Gymnasium; Lawrence, KS
February 26		at Missouri; Border War	L 20–26	11-4 (6-3)	Rothwell Gymnasium; Columbia, MO
February 27		at Missouri; Border War	W 33–26	12-4 (7-3)	Rothwell Gymnasium; Columbia, MO
February 28		at Washington University (MO)	W 29–28	13-4 (8-3)	Francis Gymnasium; St. Louis, MO
*Non-conference game. ^{#}Rankings from AP Poll. (#) Tournament seedings in parentheses.
