= 1912–13 Drexel Blue and Gold men's basketball team =

American college basketball season

1912–13 Drexel Blue and Gold men's basketball
- Conference: Independent
- Record: –
- Head coach: Frank Griffin (3rd season)
- Home arena: Main Building

The 1912–13 Drexel Blue and Gold men's basketball team represented Drexel Institute of Art, Science and Industry during the 1912–13 men's basketball season. The Blue and Gold, led by 3rd year head coach Frank Griffin, played their home games at Main Building.

== Roster ==
1912–13 Drexel Dragons men's basketball team
Players
Coaches

Pos.	#	Name	Height	Weight	Year	Previous school	Hometown
		J. Stock	—	—
		Vanaman	—	—
		Evans	—	—
		Keebler	—	—
		Fulton	—	—
		Ingram	—	—
		Coogan	—	—

Head coach

- No coach

Assistant coach(es)

Legend

- (C) Team captain
- (S) Suspended
- (I) Ineligible
- (W) Walk-on
- Injured
- Current redshirt

== Schedule ==
Date time, TV	Rank^{#}	Opponent^{#}	Result	Record	High points	High rebounds	High assists	Site (attendance) city, state
Regular season
December 6, 1912*		at Manhattan	L 23–49		7 – Vanaman	–	–	De La Salle Court
January, 1913*		Pratt	L –	–	–	–	–	
January 15, 1913*		at Delaware	W 33–30		13 – Stock	–	–	Taylor Gym; Newark, DE
January 25, 1913*		at Seton Hall	L 14–52		–	–	–	South Orange, NJ
Unknown*		Philadelphia School of Pedagogy	W –		–	–	–	
Unknown*		Moravian						
*Non-conference game. ^{#}Rankings from AP. (#) Tournament seedings in parentheses. All times are in Eastern Time.
