= 1912–13 Bucknell Bison men's basketball team =

American college basketball season

1912–13 Bucknell Bison men's basketball
- Conference: Independent
- Record: 4–13
- Head coach: H.E. Zehner (1st season)
- Captain: H.V. Fisher
- Home arena: none

The 1912–13 Bucknell Bison men's basketball team represented Bucknell University during the 1912–13 NCAA men's basketball season. The head coach was H.E. Zehner, coaching the Bison in his first season. The Bison's team captain was H.V. Fisher.

== Schedule ==
Date time, TV	Opponent	Result	Record	Site city, state
1/9/1913*	Bloomsburg	L 12–23	0–1	Lewisburg, PA
1/17/1913*	Lebanon Valley	W 31–20	1–1	Lewisburg, PA
1/25/1913*	Susquehanna	W 21–18	2–1	Lewisburg, PA
1/27/1913*	Gettysburg	W 33–26	3–1	Lewisburg, PA
2/1/1913*	at Susquehanna	W 21–18	4–1	Selinsgrove, PA
2/7/1913*	Allegheny	L 5–46	4–2	Lewisburg, PA
2/13/1913*	at Seton Hall	L 16–22	4–3	South Orange, NJ
2/14/1913*	at Pratt Institute	L 32–41	4–4	Brooklyn, NY
2/15/1913*	at Harrisburg	L 27–42	4–5	Harrisburg, PA
2/21/1913*	Pittsburgh	L 15–25	4–6	Lewisburg, PA
2/22/1913*	at Lehigh	L 17–48	4–7	Bethlehem, PA
2/28/1913*	Albright	L 17–25	4–8	Lewisburg, PA
3/7/1912*	at Albright	L 20–40	4–9	Reading, PA
3/8/1913*	at F&M	L 21–51	4–10	Lancaster, PA
3/13/1913*	at Georgetown	L 23–34	4–11	Arcade Rink; Washington, D.C.
3/14/1913*	at Mt. St. Mary's	L 11–15	4–12	Emmitsburg, MD
3/15/1913*	at Gettysburg	L 18–26	4–13	Gettysburg, PA
*Non-conference game. (#) Tournament seedings in parentheses.
