= 1912–13 Army Cadets men's basketball team =

American college basketball season

1912–13 Army Cadets men's basketball
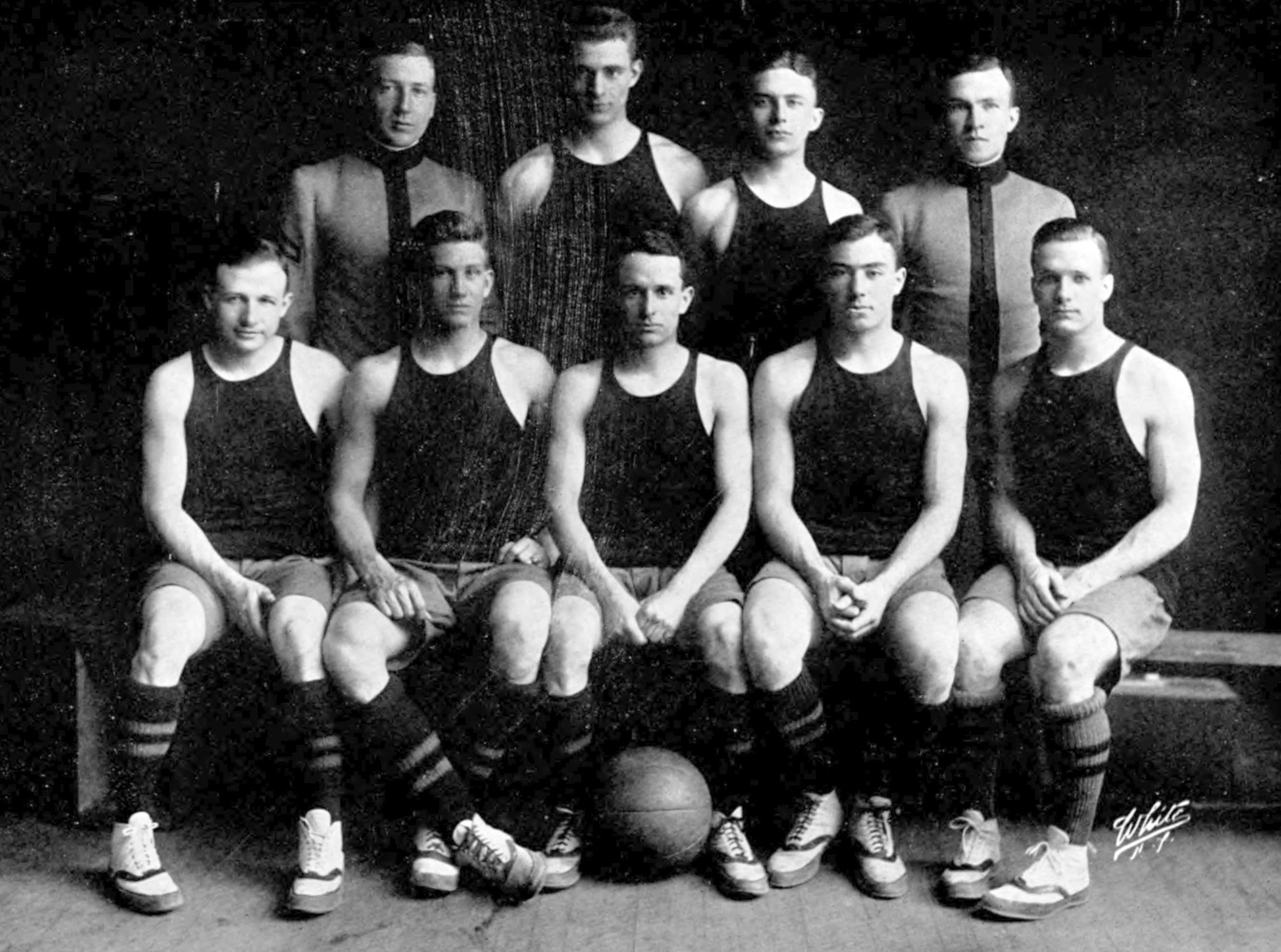
- Conference: Independent
- Record: 11–2
- Head coach: Harvey Higley (2nd season)
- Captain: John VanVliet

The 1912–13 Army Cadets men's basketball team represented United States Military Academy during the 1912–13 college men's basketball season. The head coach was Harvey Higley, coaching his second season with the Cadets. The team captain was John VanVliet.

== Schedule ==
Date time, TV	Opponent	Result	Record	Site city, state
	Yonkers Y.M.C.A.	W 35–15	1–0	West Point, NY
*	St. Lawrence	W 23–22	2–0	West Point, NY
	Pennsylvania	W 22–13	3–0	West Point, NY
	Crescent A.C.	L 18–22	3–1	West Point, NY
	Manhattan A.C.	W 32–15	4–1	West Point, NY
	Princeton	W 41–20	5–1	West Point, NY
	Wesleyan	W 29–24	6–1	West Point, NY
	Swarthmore	W 21–18	7–1	West Point, NY
	Colgate	W 26–22	8–1	West Point, NY
	Fordham	W 43–19	9–1	West Point, NY
	Rochester	W 30–14	10–1	West Point, NY
	Union	L 21–22	10–2	West Point, NY
	New York University	W 29–21	11–2	West Point, NY
*Non-conference game. (#) Tournament seedings in parentheses.
