= 1912–13 Illinois Fighting Illini men's basketball team =

American college basketball season

1912–13 Illinois Fighting Illini men's basketball
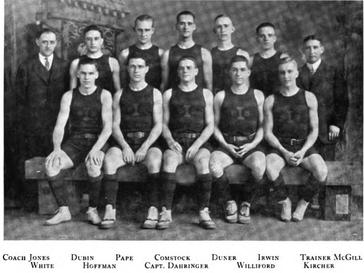
- Conference: Big Ten Conference
- Record: 10–6 (7–6 Big Ten)
- Head coach: Ralph Jones (1st season)
- Captain: Homer Dahringer
- Home arena: Kenney Gym

1912–13 Western Conference men's basketball standings
	Conf.				Overall
Team	W		L	PCT	W		L	PCT
Wisconsin	11	–	1	.917	14	–	1	.933
Northwestern	7	–	2	.778	14	–	4	.778
Chicago	8	–	4	.667	20	–	6	.769
Purdue	6	–	5	.545	7	–	5	.583
Illinois	7	–	6	.538	10	–	6	.625
Ohio State	4	–	5	.444	13	–	7	.650
Minnesota	2	–	8	.200	3	–	8	.273
Iowa	1	–	5	.167	9	–	13	.409
Indiana	0	–	10	.000	5	–	11	.313

The 1912–13 Illinois Fighting Illini men's basketball team represented the University of Illinois.

== Regular season ==
The 1912–13 season saw yet another head coach arrive in Champaign-Urbana to work with the Illinois Fighting Illini men's basketball team. Ralph Jones left an impressive legacy behind in West Lafayette, Indiana where he was head coach of Purdue for three years. During his tenure at Purdue, Jones compiled an impressive record of 32 wins with only 9 losses resulting in two conference championships. Jones was credited by some with originating the fast break in basketball. After leading the Fighting Illini to two additional conference championships and one national championship, Jones left to coach at Lake Forest Academy. In addition to coaching basketball, Jones was head coach of the Chicago Bears from 1930 to 1933, where, among other achievements, he was credited with the revival of the T-formation and the use of a man in motion to throw off the defense.

=== Roster ===
1912–13 Illinois Fighting Illini men's basketball team
Players
Coaches

Pos.	#	Name	Height	Weight	Year	Hometown
G		Sven Duner	—	—	So	Downers Grove, Illinois
G		James G. White	—	—	Sr	Chicago, Illinois
C		Homer W. Dahringer (C)	—	—	Sr	Ludington, Michigan
F		Helmuth Kircher	—	—	So	Kalamazoo, Michigan
C		Edward Williford	—	—	So	Binghamton, New York
G		Robert William Hoffman	—	—	So	Detroit, Michigan
C		Daniel Franklin Comstock	—	—	So	Evanston, Illinois
F		Walter Boynton Erwin	—	—	So	Chicago, Illinois
F		George Harold Dubin	—	—	Jr	Chicago, Illinois
C		Leroy Frendenberg Pape	—	—	Sr	Chicago, Illinois

Head coach

- Ralph Jones (Indianapolis YMCA Training School) (1st year)

Assistant coach(es)

Legend

- (C) Team captain
- (S) Suspended
- (I) Ineligible
- (W) Walk-on
- Injured
- Current redshirt

Roster

== Schedule ==
Date time, TV	Rank^{#}	Opponent^{#}	Result	Record	Site city, state
Non-Conference regular season
12/20/1912*		vs Illinois Wesleyan	W 18–13	1-0	Kenney Gym; Urbana, IL
1/4/1913*		at Decatur YMCA	W 27–13	2-0	Decatur YMCA; Decatur, IL
1/6/1913*		at Rose Polytechnic Institute	W 52–14	3-0	Indiana State Normal School North Hall; Terre Haute, IN
Big Ten regular season
1/11/1913		Wisconsin	L 15–16	3-1 (0-1)	Kenney Gym; Urbana, IL
1/21/1913		Purdue	W 22–18	4-1 (1-1)	Kenney Gym; Urbana, IL
1/28/1913		Iowa; Rivalry	W 35–9	5-1 (2-1)	Kenney Gym; Urbana, IL
2/8/1913		Minnesota	W 19–12	6-1 (3-1)	Kenney Gym; Urbana, IL
2/14/1913		Northwestern; Rivalry	W 23–22	7-1 (4-1)	Kenney Gym; Urbana, IL
2/21/1913		at Wisconsin	L 13–18	7-2 (4-2)	University of Wisconsin Armory and Gymnasium; Madison, WI
2/22/1913		at Minnesota	W 20–10	8-2 (5-2)	University of Minnesota Armory; Minneapolis, MN
2/26/1913		University of Chicago	L 12–19	8-3 (5-3)	Kenney Gym; Urbana, IL
3/1/1913		Indiana; Rivalry	W 29–12	9-3 (6-3)	Kenney Gym; Urbana, IL
3/7/1913		at Purdue	L 11–12	9-4 (6-4)	Memorial Gymnasium; West Lafayette, IN
3/8/1913		at Indiana; Rivalry	W 23–17	10-4 (7-4)	Old Assembly Hall; Bloomington, IN
3/14/1913		at University of Chicago	L 16–21	10-5 (7-5)	Bartlett Gymnasium; Chicago, IL
3/15/1913		at Northwestern; Rivalry	L 18–20	10-6 (7-6)	Patten Gymnasium; Evanston, IL
*Non-conference game. ^{#}Rankings from AP Poll. (#) Tournament seedings in parentheses. All times are in Central Time.
