= Ellery Huntington Jr. =

American football player and coach (1893–1987)

Biographical details
- Born: March 11, 1893; Nashville, Tennessee, U.S.
- Died: July 2, 1987 (aged 94); Alexandria, Virginia, U.S.

Playing career
- 1910–1913: Colgate
- 1917: Camp Dix
- Position: Quarterback

Coaching career (HC unless noted)
- 1915–1916: Colgate (Assistant)
- 1919–1921: Colgate

Head coaching record
- Overall: 10–10–5

Accomplishments and honors

Awards
- Consensus All-American (1913)
- College Football Hall of Fame; Inducted in 1972 (profile)

Ellery Channing Huntington Jr. (March 11, 1893 – July 2, 1987) was an American football player and coach. He played college football as a quarterback at Colgate University. Huntington also served as the 19th head football coach at Colgate, holding that position for three seasons, from 1919 until 1921 and compiling a record of 10–10–5. He was elected to the College Football Hall of Fame in 1972. After his coaching career, Huntington was a lawyer, corporate executive, and military officer during World War II.

== Athletics ==
Huntington was the son of Ellery Huntington Sr., longtime athletic director at Colgate. He played quarterback at Colgate from 1910 to 1913 and was named to Walter Camp's 1913 All-America Team. He was captain of the 1913–14 Colgate men's basketball team and was a member of the school's track team.

== Coaching ==
Huntington was an assistant at Colgate under Laurence Bankart in 1915 and 1916 and was chosen to succeed him as head coach in 1917. However, he entered the United States Army before the season began.

In 1919, Bankart was once again named Colgate's head coach and Huntington returned as his assistant. However, Bankart was head coach in name only, with Huntington doing much of the work. In 1920, Huntington officially became head coach. He returned in 1921, but announced at the end of the season that he would be unable to return the following year. He was succeeded by Dick Harlow.

== World War I ==
Huntington entered the officers' training camp at Plattsburgh in May 1917. He was commissioned a captain in the field artillery and assigned to Battery C of the 307th Field Artillery Regiment, 78th Infantry Division on August 15, 1917. He was stationed at Fort Dix and played quarterback for the 1917 Camp Dix football team. He was sent to France on May 8, 1918 and saw action in the Meuse–Argonne offensive. He returned to the United States on March 12, 1919 and was discharged five days later.

== Business career ==
Huntington graduated from Harvard Law School in 1917. He was a partner in the New York City law firm of Satterlee & Canfield. In 1933, he and another partner, David M. Milton, acquired control of the Equity Corporation from Wallace Groves. Huntington was an officer and director of the Equity Corporation of New York until 1941. He was also president of National Postal Meter Company.

Huntington returned to Equity Corporation in 1945 as president. He then served as chairman until his retirement in 1958. He also served as a director of the Morris Plan Banks, Bell Aircraft, and United Industrial Corporation.

== World War II ==
Huntington knew Office of Strategic Services head William J. Donovan from playing squash and on May 8, 1942, Huntington was named chief of the OSS's newly established Security Branch. This was the paramilitary branch of the OSS; it was "set up to organize sabotage on roads, industries, communications, etc., to proceed with or in advance of military operations or without them and will plan, recruit and equip such agents when desired [...] inciting and supporting guerrilla warfare in enemy-occupied areas [...] aiding in the organization and support of revolutionary movements [...] design, develop and produce bombs, incendiaries, and other sabotage weapons [and to] arm and equip secret armies." His first assignment was supervising Amy Elizabeth Thorpe and Charles Emanuel Brousse's theft of Vichy France's naval code books from a safe in a locked and guarded room at the Wardman Park Hotel. Huntington also performed undercover work with agents in North Africa before Operation Torch. In 1944, Huntington was named head of the American military mission in Yugoslavia. He commanded a detachment of Army liaison officers posted to Josip Broz Tito's Yugoslav Partisans and was tasked with informing the United States about the partisans' fight against the Axis occupation troops and arranging for supply drops and nightly air evacuation of the wounded.

== Personal life ==
Huntington was the nephew of Boston University president William Edwards Huntington and grandnephew of clergyman Frederic Dan Huntington.

From 1917 to 1929, Huntington was married to Hester Gibson, daughter of Robert W. Gibson. The sister-in-law of Communist Party USA leader Robert Minor, she hosted meetings of the American League Against War and Fascism and provided bail for party chairman Earl Browder. They had two daughters, Hester and Susan, and one son, Ellery III. Ellery III was killed in action in World War II. Susan Huntington was a graduate of the Neighborhood Playhouse School of the Theatre and the wife of actors Warren Stevens and Don Hanmer.

While working for the OSS, Huntington met Helen Catherine DuBois, a secretary to the OSS intelligence chief in Algiers. They married in 1946 and had one son.

== Head coaching record ==
Year	Team	Overall	Conference	Standing	Bowl/playoffs
Colgate (Independent) (1919–1921)
1919	Colgate	5–1–1			
1920	Colgate	1–5–2			
1921	Colgate	4–4–2			
Colgate:		10–10–5			
Total:		10–10–5			
