= 1912–13 Connecticut Aggies men's basketball team =

American college basketball season

1912–13 Connecticut Aggies men's basketball
- Conference: Athletic League of New England State Colleges
- Record: 0–3 (0–0 ALNESC)

The 1912–13 Connecticut Aggies men's basketball team represented Connecticut Agricultural College, now the University of Connecticut, in the 1912–13 collegiate men's basketball season. The Aggies completed the season with a 0–3 overall record. The Aggies were members of the Athletic League of New England State Colleges.

== Schedule ==
Date time, TV	Rank^{#}	Opponent^{#}	Result	Record	Site (attendance) city, state
Regular Season
*		Springfield YMCA	L 14–59	0–1	
*		Mittineague	L 15–47	0–2	
*		Suffield Institute	L 15–44	0–3	
*Non-conference game. ^{#}Rankings from AP Poll. (#) Tournament seedings in parentheses. All times are in Eastern Time.

Schedule Source:
