= 1912–13 Cincinnati Bearcats men's basketball team =

American college basketball season

1912–13 Cincinnati Bearcats men's basketball
- Conference: Ohio Athletic Conference
- Record: 4–7 (3–3 OAC)
- Head coach: Russell Easton (3rd season)
- Captain: Adolph Davis
- Home arena: Schmidlapp Gymnasium

The 1912–13 Cincinnati Bearcats men's basketball team represented the University of Cincinnati during the 1912–13 college men's basketball season. The head coach was Russell Easton, coaching his third season with the Bearcats.

== Schedule ==
Date time, TV	Opponent	Result	Record	Site city, state
January 17	Earlham	W 27–16	1–0	Schmidlapp Gymnasium; Cincinnati, OH
January 24	Wittenberg	W 43–30	2–0	Schmidlapp Gymnasium; Cincinnati, OH
January 30	Otterbein	L 21–31	2–1	Schmidlapp Gymnasium; Cincinnati, OH
February 1	at Miami (OH)	L 26–42	2–2	Oxford, OH
February 6	at Otterbein	L 11–43	2–3	Westerville, OH
February 8	at Kentucky	L 18–20	2–4	State College Gymnasium; Lexington, KY
February 14	at Denison	L 29–78	2–5	Granville, OH
February 21	Kenyon	W 42–13	3–5	Schmidlapp Gymnasium; Cincinnati, OH
March 3	at Wittenberg	L 26–44	3–6	Springfield, OH
March 7	Otterbein	L 16–81	3–7	Schmidlapp Gymnasium; Cincinnati, OH
March 14	Miami (OH)	W 44–20	4–7	Schmidlapp Gymnasium; Cincinnati, OH
*Non-conference game. (#) Tournament seedings in parentheses.
