= Eddie Calder =

American basketball player

Career information
- College: St. Lawrence (1910–1913)
- Position: Forward

Career history
- 1913–1914: Crescent A.C.

Career highlights
- Helms National Player of the Year (1913); Helms All-American (1913)

Eddie "Ek" Calder was an American college basketball standout at St. Lawrence University in the 1910s. He was a Helms Athletic Foundation All-American in 1913 and was also named their national player of the year that season. He played the forward position and was St. Lawrence's second Helms All-American in two seasons (Thomas Canfield earned the honor in 1912).
