= 1912–13 Ohio Bobcats men's basketball team =

American college basketball season

1912–13 Ohio Bobcats men's basketball
- Conference: Ohio Athletic Conference
- Record: 5–8 (2–6 OAC)
- Head coach: C.M. Douthit (1st season)
- Home arena: Ohio Gymnasium

The 1912–13 Ohio Bobcats men's basketball team represented Ohio University. C.M. Douthit was the head coach for Ohio. The Bobcats played their home games in Ohio Gymnasium.

== Schedule ==
Date time, TV	Rank^{#}	Opponent^{#}	Result	Record	Site (attendance) city, state
Regular Season
*		at Dayton	L 25–67	0–1	Montgomery County Fairgrounds Coliseum; Dayton, OH
		Ohio Wesleyan	L 14–58	0–2	Ohio Gymnasium; Athens, OH
*		Marietta	W 32–28	1–2	Ohio Gymnasium; Athens, OH
*		Antioch	W 19–16	2–2	Ohio Gymnasium; Athens, OH
*		Otterbein	W 27–24	3–2	Ohio Gymnasium; Athens, OH
		Denison	L 17–59	3–3	Ohio Gymnasium; Athens, OH
		Heidelberg	L 18–25	3–4	Ohio Gymnasium; Athens, OH
		at Wittenberg	L 20–24	3–5	Springfield, OH
		at Kenyon	W 35–22	4–5	Gambier, OH
		at Akron	L 12–30	4–6	Crouse Gymnasium; Akron, OH
		at Wooster	L 23–41	4–7	Wooster, OH
*		at Marietta	L 18–42	4–8	Marietta, OH
		Western Reserve	W 36–20	5–8	Ohio Gymnasium; Athens, OH
*Non-conference game. ^{#}Rankings from AP Poll. (#) Tournament seedings in parentheses. All times are in Eastern Time.
