= 1912–13 Seton Hall Pirates men's basketball team =

American college basketball season

1912–13 Seton Hall Pirates men's basketball
- Conference: Independent
- Record: 11–3
- Head coach: Frank Hill (2nd season)
- Captain: Game Captains

The 1912–13 Seton Hall Pirates men's basketball team represented Seton Hall University during the 1912–13 college men's basketball season. The head coach was Frank Hill, coaching his second season with the Pirates.

== Schedule ==
| Date time, TV | Opponent | Result | Record | Site city, state |
|---|---|---|---|---|
| 11/28/1912* | at Maplewood F.C. | L 18–20 | 0–1 | |
| 11/30/1912* | at Ashbury Park YMCA | W 35–19 | 1–1 | |
| 12/05/1912* | Maryland | W 42–21 | 2–1 | South Orange, NJ |
| 12/10/1912* | at St. John's (MD) | L 22–31 | 2–2 | |
| 12/12/1912* | Cathedral | W 23–22 | 3–2 | South Orange, NJ |
| 12/19/1912* | at Ashbury Lyceum | W 25–20 | 4–2 | |
| 1/03/1913* | Niagara | W 23–15 | 5–2 | South Orange, NJ |
| 1/08/1913* | at Fordham | W 24–18 | 6–2 | Bronx, NY |
| 1/10/1913* | at Springfield Train | W 19–14 | 7–2 | South Orange, NJ |
| 1/15/1913* | at Maplewood F.C. | W 23–13 | 8–2 | South Orange, NJ |
| 1/21/1913* | at Cathedral | L 14–28 | 8–3 | |
| 1/25/1913* | Drexel | W 52–14 | 9–3 | South Orange, NJ |
| 2/06/1913* | at Manhattan | W 24–14 | 10–3 | Riverdale, NY |
| 2/13/1913* | Bucknell | W 22–16 | 11–3 | South Orange, NJ |
*Non-conference game. (#) Tournament seedings in parentheses.
