= 1912–13 North Carolina Tar Heels men's basketball team =

American college basketball season

1912–13 North Carolina Tar Heels men's basketball
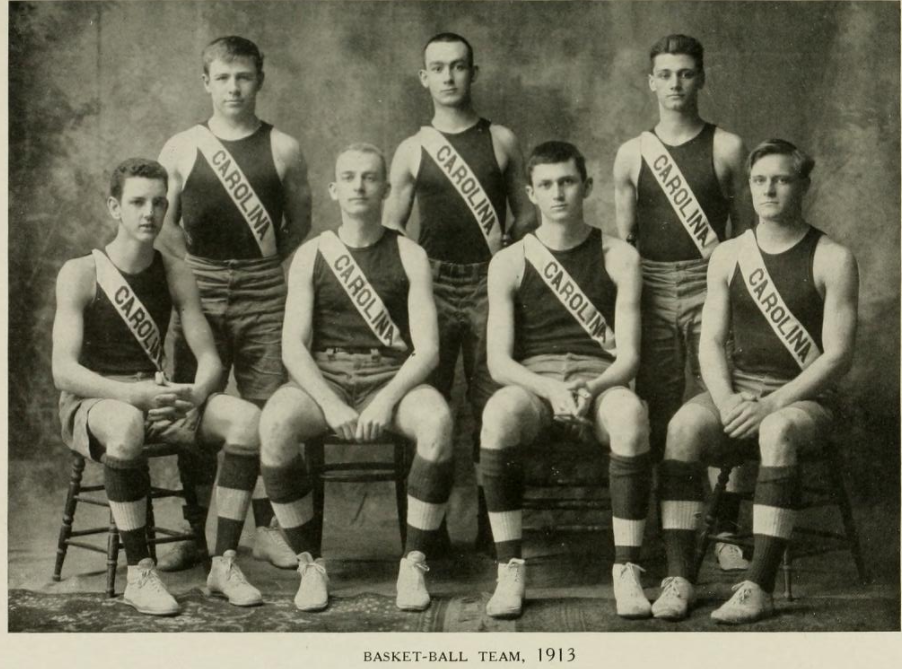
- Conference: Independent
- Record: 4–7
- Head coach: Nathaniel Cartmell (3rd season)
- Captain: Lenoir Chambers (Note: The Tar Heel reported in September 1912 that the basketball team captain was Lenoir Chambers, while the team captain for the season is listed as Ben Edwards in the Carolina Basketball 2018–19 Facts & Records Book.)
- Home arena: Bynum Gymnasium

The 1912–13 North Carolina Tar Heels men's basketball team (variously "North Carolina", "Carolina" or "Tar Heels") was the third varsity college basketball team to represent the University of North Carolina. (Note: The school was known as the University of North Carolina until February 1963.) In September, Lenoir Chambers was announced team captain. North Carolina, along with several other schools from the state, met in Raleigh, North Carolina and formed the North Carolina Intercollegiate Basketball Association that would establish a state championship where each school in the league would play two games against all other members and the team with the best record was the champion. However, the league did not come to fruition partially because Trinity College's professors did not want to have athletic contests with North Carolina. Student–run newspaper The Tar Heel published several pieces where they stated the prior season's poor performance was because the team did not start practicing until after Christmas. Try-outs started in early December, but over time participating students dwindled and scrimmaging became difficult, which prompted Chambers to publish in ad in the student newspaper asking for taller players to come by regardless of their experience.

In January, after exams, the season opened with a four–game home stand. Following an opening one–point loss to the Durham Y.M.C.A., the Tar Heels won back–to–back games by large margins against Davidson College and Elon College. With Redmon out due to an ankle injury, the team faced Emory and Henry College and lost 20–17. The Tar Heels played their next three games on the road, two of which took place at the Raleigh Auditorium, and lost all three games. In one of those losses, the Tar Heels took Wake Forest to overtime, but were outscored 2–1 and lost the match. Carolina snapped their four-game losing streak against Virginia Agricultural and Mechanical College and Polytechnic Institute (V.P.I.) in a game where Carolina won handily 29–9. The Tar Heels dropped their next two against Guilford College, who was regarded as the state's premier team that season, and a rematch against Elon where The Tar Heel commented the team played its "weakest game." Carolina ended their season with a rematch against Wake Forest where the Tar Heels led for the entire game and won 19–15.

== Pre-season ==
In late September 1912, it was announced that guard Lenoir Chambers was voted to be team captain for the upcoming season. In addition, it was announced baskets would be placed that week on outside tennis courts and hopefully practice would begin in the fall. However, the goals had not been placed by mid–October. In early November, The Tar Heel published a column where it credited the team's poor performance the previous year due to starting practice after Christmas, stating successful programs practiced in October. The writer commented that at this point captain Chambers had the players "report" and the team managers had not organized a try–out. The writer further mentioned that several students had been playing on the outdoor courts that were set up and would provide good opportunities to find new members as well as good competition. On Monday December 2 at 8 PM local time, the try–outs started. Several men showed up including returning players Tillett, Carrington, and Smith returned from the previous year, along with Meb Long who played two years ago. At this point, the schedule was rumored to feature 18 to 20 games, including six at home and a road trip into Virginia for several contests against the likes of Randolph–Macon College, University of Virginia, Washington and Lee University, and more.

In early January, another schedule was released with eleven games, but there were hopes to add home contests against NC A&M and Wake Forest. Of the scheduled games listed, a home game against Guilford on March 8 was not played. A home game was scheduled against Wake Forest on March 4, while the NC A&M home game did not materialize. Practice resumed following Christmas break and Chambers led practices each night while coach Nathaniel Cartmell was on temporary leave. The team was thought to have enough tall players and often the team had at most fifteen men, which made scrimmaging difficult. The first game was to happen after exams were finished. The Tar Heel stated the returning players would help the team be stronger than the previous year. With regards to the new players, it was noted that Ransom was "scrappier than ever." Guard Redman was thought to replace Erwin's void from the year prior. Chambers published an ad in the January 10, 1913 edition of The Tar Heel where he opened saying "We need more men out for the basketball team and we need them badly." Chambers cited a tough schedule and the need for more than just the roughly fifteen candidates for the team to improve and beat Virginia, NC A&M, and Wake Forest. Chambers requested "Tall men of the football type" and encouraged those without experience to try out.

=== State–wide basketball league ===
In late October, it was announced that Carolina, along with other in–state schools including Elon College, Guilford College, North Carolina College of Agriculture and Mechanic Arts (NC A&M), Trinity College, and Wake Forest, formed a basketball association, the North Carolina Intercollegiate Basketball Association. Representatives from each school met in Raleigh, North Carolina's Yarborough Hotel where they elected officers including North Carolina's manager R. O. Hufmann, who became president. Eligibility rules were agreed upon—which were stricter due to Trinity's concurrent membership of the Southern Intercollegiate Athletic Association—and it was decided that no player would be allowed to participate if they had been in college for longer than four years or participated in any professional sporting events or teams. The scheduling of basketball games was the primary topic covered at the first meeting as it was hoped that each team in attendance would play two games against each other team represented at the meeting. The state championship would then be awarded to the team that had the best record against the conference members, but if a tie happened there would be a series of games in Raleigh's city auditorium. Huffman officially scheduled a game with NC A&M for February 22 in Raleigh, with hopes for a home game during the season. More rules and organization related topics were to be decided upon at later meetings. This was viewed as a positive development because students at North Carolina had been hoping to have competitive engagements with NC A&M and Trinity in basketball and football.

In mid–December, it was reported that the North Carolina Intercollegiate Basketball Association had fallen through, in part, because Trinity faculty did not wish to have any athletic contests with North Carolina, while the students did. A reporter wrote that a rivalry between Trinity and North Carolina would "probably outstrip anything that has ever been seen in this state in any kind of athletics."

== Roster and schedule ==
1912–13 North Carolina Tar Heels roster
Name	Position	Height	Year	Hometown
George Carrington	C	6–3	Senior	Durham, North Carolina
Lenoir Chambers	C, G	5–11	Junior	Charlotte, North Carolina
Roy Homewood	G	5–10	Freshman	Burlington, North Carolina
Meb Long	F	6–0	Freshman	Charlotte, North Carolina
John Parker	G	5–10	Freshman	Bradentown, Florida
Lucius Ransom	F	5–6	Junior	Huntersville, North Carolina
Herman Redman	G	5–6	First Year Pharmacy	Marshall, North Carolina
William "Bill" Tillett	F	5–6	Senior	Charlotte, North Carolina

Schedule
Date time, TV	Opponent	Result	Record	Site city, state
Regular season
January 25, 1913*	Durham Y.M.C.A.	L 22–23	0–1	Bynum Gymnasium; Chapel Hill, North Carolina
February 3, 1913*	Davidson College	W 42–8	1–1	Bynum Gymnasium; Chapel Hill, North Carolina
February 5, 1913*	Elon College	W 41–11	2–1	Bynum Gymnasium; Chapel Hill, North Carolina
February 7, 1913*	Emory and Henry College	L 17–20	2–2	Bynum Gymnasium; Chapel Hill, North Carolina
February 10, 1913*	vs. Virginia	L 19–30	2–3	Raleigh Auditorium; Raleigh, North Carolina
February 15, 1915*	at Wake Forest	L 21–22 ^{OT}	2–4	Wake Forest, North Carolina
February 22, 1913*	at North Carolina College of Agriculture and Mechanic Arts	L 18–26	2–5	Raleigh Auditorium; Raleigh, North Carolina
February 25, 1913*	Virginia Agricultural and Mechanical College and Polytechnic Institute	W 29–9	3–5	Bynum Gymnasium; Chapel Hill, North Carolina
February 28, 1913*	at Guilford College	L 29–44	3–6	
March 1, 1913*	at Elon College	L 19–23	3–7	
March 4, 1913*	Wake Forest	W 19–15	4–7	Bynum Gymnasium; Chapel Hill, North Carolina
*Non-conference game. ^{#}Rankings from AP Poll. (#) Tournament seedings in parentheses. All times are in Eastern Time.

== Regular season ==
North Carolina opened their season with a home game against the Durham Y.M.C.A. After teams traded baskets in the first half, Durham led by a single point going into the half, 11–10. The Tar Heels opened the second half scoring six points unanswered before a scoreless period. Durham managed to score eight points to Carolina's three, to retake the lead. Carolina's Redman then made a basket to take the lead. In the closing seconds, following a jump ball, Durham made a basket and time expired shortly after, giving Durham the win 23–22. Carolina was thought to have had poor teamwork and "weak" passing, while missing ten of sixteen free throw attempts hurt the team as well. The Tar Heel commented that the crowd for the game was "rude" and "semi–civilized," expressing desire to show visiting teams more respect in the future. Davidson College came next to Chapel Hill for a game on February 3. North Carolina shut out Davidson in the first half as they scored 16 points. The Tar Heels were led by Long and Carrington, who made the majority of the scores on their way to a 42–8 victory. Two days later, North Carolina faced Elon in a fast-paced match. The Tar Heels outscored the visitors by double digits each half on their way to a 41–11 win.

Emory and Henry College entered Chapel Hill two days later to face a Carolina team missing Redmon, who was absent due to an ankle injury. Emory scored quickly and then due to "wild and erratic" play, no team scored for a couple minutes until Homewood leveled the score. The teams improved their play and each scored a couple times before Emory took control and went into halftime with a 11–6 lead. Emory continued shooting well in the second half and increased their advantage. Carolina closed the score, but time expired and Emory won 20–17. Twelve hundred spectators packed the Raleigh Auditorium to see North Carolina take on Virginia. Virginia's offense in the first half was dribbling heavy and allowed them to get an early 8–3 lead, while North Carolina rallied with long shots to level the score at 13 for the half. Carolina's Redmon was disqualified for "rough playing" and the crowd yelled furiously at the referee, which stalled the game ten minutes. Homewood replaced Redmon for Carolina, but without Redmon – who had been playing great defense on Virginia's best player – Carolina fouled Virginia several times and their forward Gill converted several attempts. Virginia closed the game out to win 30–19. After the game, The Tar Heel wrote that the team played its best ball of the season in the first half.

The Tar Heels went on the road and faced Wake Forest in what The Tar Heel referred to as a "fine exhibition" where both teams played "hard and rough." The Baptists led entering the half at 14–8. In the second half, North Carolina made a comeback primarily through foul shots, of which Long made 9 of 12 for the game. The second half expired with the teams level at 20, which meant the teams would play a five-minute overtime period. Wake Forest's Holding made one shot in the period, while Carolina's Long made a foul shot. Holding carried Wake Forest to the win behind 20 points. In advance of the matchup against NC A&M, Carolina students who had season tickets were announced to have gotten free admission to the game in Raleigh on February 22. This likely contributed to what was reported as the largest crowd to attend a basketball game in North Carolina at 2,500 people. This was the first contest between the schools, aside from track meets, in seven years. The teams played slowly and each played tight defense in the first half, which resulted in a 9–6 score in favor of NC A&M. Each team's play intensified in the second half and several shots were made from long distance. The Farmers' Sumner made a long shot with a backwards throw over his head en route to a 26–18 victory.

Three days later, back in Chapel Hill, V.P.I. and North Carolina squared off and went scoreless for the first five minutes, before Carolina's Long made a foul shot. Carolina then scored nine more points while shutting out V.P.I. V.P.I. managed to only score five points in the first half and four in the second, unable to counter the Tar Heels' offense, the final score was 29–9 in favor of Carolina. The Tar Heel praised the North Carolina squad's teamwork in the game. Guilford, regarded as the best team in the state, were led by forward Benbow who proceeded to score 32 of the team's 44 points as they beat the Tar Heels. Carolina's next game was a rematch against Elon on March 1. Carolina won the first half 12–9, but Elon overcame that deficit and took the lead and won the game behind a great performance from Johnson. The Tar Heel wrote that this was Carolina's "weakest game of the season." The final game of the season was a rematch against Wake Forest. Carolina led the whole game and won the game 19–15. Carrington was the game's leading scorer with three field goals.
