= 1912–13 Penn State Nittany Lions basketball team =

American college basketball season

1912–13 Penn State Nittany Lions basketball
- Conference: Independent
- Record: 8–3
- Head coach: Student coaches
- Captain: B.L. Hartz
- Home arena: Armory

The 1912–13 Penn State Nittany Lions basketball team represented Penn State University during the 1912–13 college men's basketball season. The team finished with a final record of 8–3. The Nittany Lions were not in a conference at this point, but rather they were an NCAA Division I independent schools. The basketball team would join several conferences before joining the Big Ten Conference in 1992-93.

== Schedule ==
Date time, TV	Opponent	Result	Record	Site city, state
1/08/1913*	Pittsburgh Collegians	W 48–30	1–0	Armory; State College, PA
1/16/1913*	at Westinghouse Club	W 46–16	2–0	
1/17/1913*	at Pittsburgh	W 30–25	3–0	Duquesne Garden; Pittsburgh, PA
1/18/1913*	at Carnegie Tech	W 34–14	4–0	Pittsburgh, PA
1/22/1913*	Lehigh	W 29–15	5–0	Armory; State College, PA
1/25/1913*	Carnegie Tech	W 43–16	6–0	Armory; State College, PA
2/08/1913*	Allegheny	W 21–17	7–0	Armory; State College, PA
2/13/1913*	at Lehigh	L 28–37	7–1	Bethlehem, PA
2/14/1913*	at Swarthmore	L 26–29	7–2	Swarthmore, PA
2/15/1913*	at Franklin & Marshall	L 23–26	7–3	
2/22/1913*	Pittsburgh	W 31–20	8–3	Armory; State College, PA
*Non-conference game. (#) Tournament seedings in parentheses.
