= 1912–13 Colgate men's basketball team =

American college basketball season

1912–13 Colgate Raiders men's basketball
- Conference: Independent
- Record: 7–7
- Head coach: Ellery Huntington, Sr. (13th season)
- Captain: Walt Hammond
- Home arena: none

The 1912–13 Colgate Raiders men's basketball team represented Colgate University during the 1912–13 college men's basketball season. The head coach was Ellery Huntington Sr. coaching the Raiders in his 13th season. The team finished with a final record of 7–7. The team captain was Walt Hammond.

== Schedule ==
Date time, TV	Opponent	Result	Record	Site city, state
*	Toronto	W 52–34	1–0	
*	Rochester	W 37–31	2–0	
*	Union	L 22–28	2–1	
*	Williams	L 19–23	2–2	
*	at RPI	W 40–23	3–2	
*	at Army	L 22–26	3–3	
*	Syracuse	W 36–24	4–3	
*	at Cornell	W 34–23	5–3	
*	at Union	L 21–38	5–4	
*	at Williams	L 22–24	5–5	
*	Cornell	L 29–45	5–6	
*	at Syracuse	L 20–43	5–7	
*	at Rochester	W 21–17	6–7	
*	St. Lawrence	W 26–20	7–7	
*Non-conference game. (#) Tournament seedings in parentheses.
