= Gil Halstead =

American basketball player

Personal information
- Born: April 1, 1893
- Died: June 1970 (aged 77)

Career information
- High school: Adelphi Academy (Brooklyn, New York)
- College: Cornell (1911–1914)
- Position: Center

Career highlights
- 2× Helms All-American (1913, 1914); Helms National Player of the Year (1914)

George C. "Gil" Halstead (April 1, 1893 – June 1970) was an American college basketball standout at Cornell University in the 1910s. He was a Helms Athletic Foundation All-American in both 1913 and 1914, and was named their national player of the year after the 1913–14 season in which he helped the Big Red win back-to-back Eastern Intercollegiate League season championships.
