= 1912–13 New Mexico Lobos men's basketball team =

American college basketball season

1912–13 New Mexico Lobos men's basketball
- Conference: Independent
- Record: 6–0
- Head coach: Ralph Hutchinson (3rd season)

The 1912–13 New Mexico Lobos men's basketball team represented the University of New Mexico during the 1912–13 NCAA college men's basketball season. The head coach was Ralph Hutchinson, coaching his third season with the Lobos.

== Schedule ==
Date time, TV	Opponent	Result	Record	Site city, state
Jan. 11, 1913	Albuquerque Indian School	W 35–19	1–0	Albuquerque, New Mexico
Jan. 25, 1913	El Paso High School	W 29–22	2–0	Albuquerque, New Mexico
Feb. 1, 1913	New Mexico Highlands	W 24–21	3–0	Albuquerque, New Mexico
Feb. 7, 1913	at Albuquerque High School	W 26–25	4–0	Albuquerque, New Mexico
Feb. 15, 1913	Albuquerque Indian School	W 20–17	5–0	Albuquerque, New Mexico
Feb. 28, 1913	at New Mexico State; Rivalry	W 28–12	6–0	Las Cruces, New Mexico
*Non-conference game. (#) Tournament seedings in parentheses.
