= 1912–13 Trinity Blue and White men's basketball team =

American college basketball season

1912–13 Trinity Blue and White men's basketball
- Conference: Independent
- Record: 11–8
- Head coach: Joseph Brinn (1st season)
- Captain: Claude Brinn
- Home arena: The Ark

The 1912–13 Trinity Blue and White's basketball team represented Trinity College (later renamed Duke University) during the 1912–13 men's college basketball season. The head coach was Joseph Brinn, coaching his first season with Trinity. The team finished with an overall record of 11–8.

== Schedule ==
Date time, TV	Opponent	Result	Record	Site city, state
*	Durham YMCA	L 13–28	0–1	The Ark; Durham, NC
*	at Asheville YMCA	W 29–27	1–1	Asheville, NC
*	at Asheville YMCA	L 16–21	1–2	Asheville, NC
*	at Wofford	W 47–12	2–2	
*	at Charlotte YMCA	L 25–28	3–2	Charlotte, NC
*	at Charlotte YMCA	W 21–10	3–3	Charlotte, NC
*	Durham YMCA	W 28–25	4–3	The Ark; Durham, NC
*	Elon	W 46–12	5–3	The Ark; Durham, NC
*	at Washington and Lee	L 15–90	5–4	
*	at VMI	L 10–28	5–5	
*	at Virginia	L 12–33	5–6	Charlottesville, NC
*	at Georgetown	L 22–31	5–7	Washington, D.C.
*	at Catholic	L 27–55	5–8	
*	Emory and Henry	W 36–15	6–8	The Ark; Durham, NC
*	at NC State	W 22–18	7–8	Raleigh, NC
*	Wake Forest	W 25–10	8–8	The Ark; Durham, NC
*	at Wake Forest	W 16-15	9–8	Wake Forest, NC
*	Virginia Tech	W 23–16	10–8	The Ark; Durham, NC
*	NC State	W 32–14	11–8	The Ark; Durham, NC
*Non-conference game. (#) Tournament seedings in parentheses.
