= Louis Wenzell =

American basketball coach

Biographical details
- Born: February 10, 1888
- Died: August 13, 1955 (aged 67)

Playing career
- 1908–1912: Navy

Coaching career (HC unless noted)
- 1912–1913: Navy

Head coaching record
- Overall: 9–0 (1.000)

Accomplishments and honors

Championships
- 1 Helms National (1913)

Louis Peter Wenzell (February 10, 1888 – August 13, 1955) was the head men's basketball coach at the United States Naval Academy during the 1912–13 NCAA men's basketball season. In his only season, Wenzell guided the Midshipmen to a perfect 9–0 record. The team was retroactively named the 1912–13 national champion by the Helms Athletic Foundation and was retroactively listed as the top team of the season by the Premo-Porretta Power Poll. He had been a player at Navy just prior to taking over the team for one season.

Wenzell became a rear admiral in the United States Navy. He served in both World War I and World War II.

== Head coaching record ==
Record table
Season	Team	Overall	Conference	Standing	Postseason
Navy Midshipmen (NCAA independent) (1912–1913)
1912–13	Navy	9–0			Helms National Champions
Total:		9–0 (1.000)			
National champion Postseason invitational champion Conference regular season champion Conference regular season and conference tournament champion Division regular season champion Division regular season and conference tournament champion Conference tournament champion
