= 1912–13 Niagara Purple Eagles men's basketball team =

American college basketball season

1912–13 Niagara Purple Eagles men's basketball
- Conference: Independent
- Record: 9–10
- Head coach: A.V. Barrett (2nd season)

The 1912–13 Niagara Purple Eagles men's basketball team represented Niagara University during the 1912–13 NCAA college men's basketball season. The head coach was A.V. Barrett, coaching his second season with the Purple Eagles.

== Schedule ==
Date time, TV	Opponent	Result	Record	Site city, state
	Rochester YMCA	W 86–20	1–0	Lewiston, NY
	Buffalo Germans	L 14–60	1–1	Lewiston, NY
	Brooklyn Polytech	L 21–22	1–2	Lewiston, NY
1/7/1913	St. John's	L 26–29	1–3	Queens, NY
12/12/1911	Manhattan	L 22–24	1–4	Lewiston, NY
	St. Vincent's Lyceum	W 50–30	2–4	Lewiston, NY
	Manhattan	W 41–23	3–4	Lewiston, NY
	Clarkson Tech.	W 54–31	4–4	Lewiston, NY
	Oswego Herkimers	L 26–48	4–5	Lewiston, NY
1/31/1913	Gettysburg	W 55–17	5–5	Lewiston, NY
	Pastime Club	W 32–12	6–5	Lewiston, NY
	St. Brigid's Club	W 26–21	7–5	Lewiston, NY
2/9/1913	St. John's	L 30–31	7–6	Lewiston, NY
	Potsdam Normal	L 33–45	7–7	Lewiston, NY
	Clarkson Tech	L 30–33	7–8	Lewiston, NY
	vs. St. Lawrence	L 12–31	7–9	Lewiston, NY
	Pittsburgh Collegians	W 58–25	8–9	Lewiston, NY
3/3/1913	Syracuse	L 23–58	8–10	Lewiston, NY
	St. Brigid's Club	W 48–28	9–10	Lewiston, NY
*Non-conference game. (#) Tournament seedings in parentheses.
