= 1912–13 Wisconsin Badgers men's basketball team =

American college basketball season

1912–13 Wisconsin Badgers men's basketball

Western Conference Champions
- Conference: Big Ten Conference
- Record: 14–1 (11–1 Big Ten)
- Head coach: Walter Meanwell
- Home arena: Red Gym

1912–13 Western Conference men's basketball standings
| | Conf. | | | | Overall |
| Team | W | | L | PCT | W | | L | PCT |
|---|---|---|---|---|---|---|---|---|
| Wisconsin | 11 | – | 1 | .917 | 14 | – | 1 | .933 |
| Northwestern | 7 | – | 2 | .778 | 14 | – | 4 | .778 |
| Chicago | 8 | – | 4 | .667 | 20 | – | 6 | .769 |
| Purdue | 6 | – | 5 | .545 | 7 | – | 5 | .583 |
| Illinois | 7 | – | 6 | .538 | 10 | – | 6 | .625 |
| Ohio State | 4 | – | 5 | .444 | 13 | – | 7 | .650 |
| Minnesota | 2 | – | 8 | .200 | 3 | – | 8 | .273 |
| Iowa | 1 | – | 5 | .167 | 9 | – | 13 | .409 |
| Indiana | 0 | – | 10 | .000 | 5 | – | 11 | .313 |

The 1912–13 Wisconsin Badgers men's basketball team represented University of Wisconsin–Madison. The head coach was Walter Meanwell, coaching his second season with the Badgers. The team played their home games at the Red Gym in Madison, Wisconsin and was a member of the Western Conference.

== Schedule ==
| Date time, TV | Rank^{#} | Opponent^{#} | Result | Record | Site city, state |
Regular Season
| 12/07/1912* | | Ripon (WI) | W 40–13 | 1–0 | Red Gym; Madison, WI |
| 12/12/1912* | | Beloit (WI) | W 33–10 | 2–0 | Red Gym; Madison, WI |
| 12/18/1912* | | Lake Forest (IL) | W 44–15 | 3–0 | Red Gym; Madison, WI |
| 1/11/1913 | | at Illinois | W 16–15 | 4–0 (1–0) | Kenney Gym; Urbana, IL |
| 1/13/1913 | | at Purdue | W 25–15 | 5–0 (2–0) | Memorial Gymnasium; West Lafayette, IN |
| 1/18/1913 | | at Minnesota | W 19–11 | 6–0 (3–0) | Minnesota Armory; Minneapolis, MN |
| 1/21/1913 | | Ohio State | W 22–11 | 7–0 (4–0) | Red Gym; Madison, WI |
| 1/25/1913 | | Chicago | W 31–18 | 8–0 (5–0) | Red Gym; Madison, WI |
| 2/13/1913 | | at Indiana | W 30–19 | 9–0 (6–0) | Men's Gymnasium; Bloomington, IN |
| 2/15/1913 | | at Ohio State | W 27–22 | 10–0 (7–0) | Ohio State Armory; Columbus, OH |
| 2/21/1913 | | Illinois | W 18–13 | 11–0 (8–0) | Red Gym; Madison, WI |
| 2/25/1913 | | Minnesota | W 29–11 | 12–0 (9–0) | Red Gym; Madison, WI |
| 2/27/1913 | | Indiana | W 48–10 | 13–0 (10–0) | Red Gym; Madison, WI |
| 3/01/1913 | | Purdue | W 22–19 | 14–0 (11–0) | Red Gym; Madison, WI |
| 3/07/1913 | | at Chicago | L 10–23 | 14–1 (11–1) | Bartlett Gymnasium; Chicago, IL |
*Non-conference game. ^{#}Rankings from AP Poll. (#) Tournament seedings in parentheses.
