= Dave Smalley (basketball) =

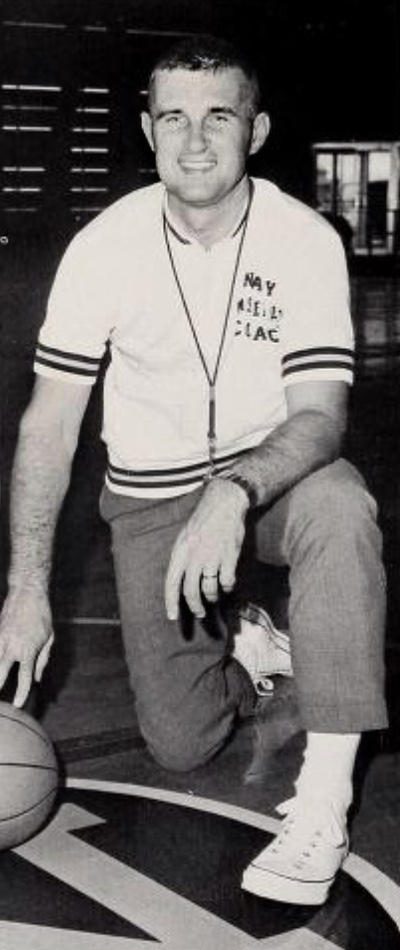
- Smalley from the 1968 Lucky Bag

Biographical details
- Born: November 29, 1934; Baltimore, Maryland, U.S.
- Died: June 1, 2007 (aged 72); Annapolis, Maryland, U.S.

Playing career
- 1954–1957: Navy

Coaching career (HC unless noted)
- 1962–1966: Navy (assistant)
- 1966–1976: Navy
- 1977–1989: Navy (women's)

David P. Smalley (November 29, 1934 – June 1, 2007) was best known as a coach of the United States Naval Academy's men's and women's basketball teams.

He was born in 1934 in Baltimore, Maryland and graduated from the Naval Academy with six letters in basketball and baseball. Smalley captained the baseball team while at the Academy.

After serving for five years in the United States Marine Corps, Smalley returned to the Naval Academy as an assistant coach of the basketball team. He took over from Ben Carnevale in 1966 and compiled a 94-130 record in his ten seasons as men's coach.

Smalley then coached the women's team between 1977 and 1989 compiling a record of 179-119. He had winning seasons as coach of the women's team in 10 out of 12 years.

Smalley continued to work in the athletic department of the Naval Academy following the end of his coaching career. In 2006, the Academy named the basketball floor at the Academy after him. He was admitted to the Maryland State Hall of Fame in 2007.
