= 1912–13 Indiana Hoosiers men's basketball team =

American college basketball season

1912–13 Indiana Hoosiers men's basketball
- Conference: Big Ten Conference
- Record: 5–11 (0–10 Western)
- Head coach: Arthur Powell (1st season)
- Captain: Haynes Freeland
- Home arena: Old Assembly Hall

1912–13 Western Conference men's basketball standings
	Conf.				Overall
Team	W		L	PCT	W		L	PCT
Wisconsin	11	–	1	.917	14	–	1	.933
Northwestern	7	–	2	.778	14	–	4	.778
Chicago	8	–	4	.667	20	–	6	.769
Purdue	6	–	5	.545	7	–	5	.583
Illinois	7	–	6	.538	10	–	6	.625
Ohio State	4	–	5	.444	13	–	7	.650
Minnesota	2	–	8	.200	3	–	8	.273
Iowa	1	–	5	.167	9	–	13	.409
Indiana	0	–	10	.000	5	–	11	.313

The 1912–13 Indiana Hoosiers men's basketball team represented Indiana University. Their head coach was Arthur Powell, who was in his first and only year. The team played its home games at the Old Assembly Hall in Bloomington, Indiana, and was a member of the Western Conference.

The Hoosiers finished the regular season with an overall record of 5–11 and a conference record of 0–10, finishing 9th in the Western Conference.

== Roster ==
Name	Position	Year	Hometown
Hugh Barnhart	C/F	N/A	Rochester, Indiana
Cline Clouse	G	N/A	Hope, Indiana
Scott Edwards	G	N/A	Greenfield, Indiana
Floyd Fleming	G	N/A	New Albany, Indiana
Haynes Freeland	F	Sr.	Indianapolis, Indiana
Everett McCullough	G/F	N/A	Brazil, Indiana
Glen Munkelt	F	Sr.	Salem, Indiana
Wade Nichols	C	N/A	Danville, Indiana
Stout (Last Name Unknown)	C	N/A	Thorntown, Indiana

== Schedule/results ==
Date time, TV	Rank^{#}	Opponent^{#}	Result	Record	Site city, state
Regular season
1/11/1913*		DePauw	W 30–14	1–0	Old Assembly Hall; Bloomington, IN
1/18/1913*		Earlham	W 32–14	2–0	Old Assembly Hall; Bloomington, IN
1/24/1913		at Purdue; Rivalry	L 19–34	2–1 (0–1)	Memorial Gymnasium; West Lafayette, IN
1/25/1913		at Ohio State	L 22–34	2–2 (0–2)	Columbus, OH
1/31/1913*		at Earlham	W 31–11	3–2 (0–2)	Richmond, IN
2/1/1913		at Northwestern	L 21–26	3–3 (0–3)	Old Patten Gymnasium; Evanston, IL
2/4/1913*		at Wabash	L 17–37	3–4 (0–3)	Crawfordsville, IN
2/8/1913*		Indiana State	W 24–6	4–4 (0–3)	Old Assembly Hall; Bloomington, IN
2/13/1913		Wisconsin	L 19–30	4–5 (0–4)	Old Assembly Hall; Bloomington, IN
2/15/1913		Northwestern	L 18–27	4–6 (0–5)	Old Assembly Hall; Bloomington, IN
2/18/1913*		Wabash	W 30–17	5–6 (0–5)	Old Assembly Hall; Bloomington, IN
2/27/1913		at Wisconsin	L 10–48	5–7 (0–6)	Red Gym; Madison, WI
3/1/1913		at Illinois; Rivalry	L 12–29	5–8 (0–7)	Kenney Gym; Urbana, IL
3/7/1913		Ohio State	L 17–19	5–9 (0–8)	Old Assembly Hall; Bloomington, IN
3/8/1913		Illinois; Rivalry	L 17–23	5–10 (0–9)	Old Assembly Hall; Bloomington, IN
3/15/1913		Purdue; Rivalry	L 21–32	5–11 (0–10)	Old Assembly Hall; Bloomington, IN
*Non-conference game. ^{#}Rankings from AP Poll. (#) Tournament seedings in parentheses.
