= Laurence Wild =

American basketball player and coach (1890–1971)

Governor of American Samoa
- In office August 8, 1940 – June 5, 1942
- Preceded by: Jesse Wallace
- Succeeded by: John Gould Moyer

Personal details
- Born: May 1, 1890 Wilber, Nebraska, U.S.
- Died: May 26, 1971 (aged 81) Coronado, California, U.S.
- Education: United States Naval Academy
- Occupation: Naval officer

Military service
- Allegiance: United States
- Branch/service: United States Navy
- Rank: Captain

Laurence Wild
Playing career
- 1913: Navy

Coaching career (HC unless noted)
- 1913–1914: Navy

Head coaching record
- Overall: 10–0

Laurence Wild (May 1, 1890 – May 26, 1971) was a United States Navy Captain, college basketball player and coach, and the governor of American Samoa from August 8, 1940, to June 5, 1942. Wild was born in Wilber, Nebraska, and lived in the 4th Congressional District of Nebraska for much of his adult life. He graduated from the United States Naval Academy in 1913; while there he played for the Navy Midshipmen basketball team, and was named a 1913 NCAA Basketball All-American. He returned as head coach of the team for one year (1913–14), coaching for ten games and winning all of them.

While a Lieutenant Commander, Wild served as a communications officer for Submarine Squadron 11. President of the United States Franklin Roosevelt recommended Wild for the rank of captain in 1939.

During his governorship, a more complicated political structure arose in American Samoa when Brigadier General Henry Louis Larsen of the United States Marine Corps became Military Governor and Island Commander of Tutuila. Though Larsen outranked him and commanded the military on the island, Wild held the senior position, and ultimately maintained control over the administration of all the islands in American Samoa. On March 13, 1941, Wild ordered the construction of an airfield on the main island.

Governor Wild was the first wartime governor of American Samoa. Under his administration, preparations for the defense of Tutuila, particularly Pago Pago, commenced. On January 5, 1942, the U.S. Navy began mining the approaches to Pago Pago. Wild recommended to the Chief of Naval Operations the establishment of an insular native force distinct from the Fitafita Guard. This led to the creation of a force that later became the First Samoan Battalion, U.S. Marine Corps Reserve.

He died in Coronado, California on May 26, 1971.
