= 1912–13 Georgetown Hoyas men's basketball team =

American college basketball season

1912–13 Georgetown Hoyas men's basketball
- Conference: Independent
- Record: 11–5
- Head coach: James Colliflower (2nd season)
- Captain: Ronayne "Roy" Waldron
- Home arena: Arcade Rink

The 1912–13 Georgetown Hoyas men's basketball team represented Georgetown University during the 1912–13 NCAA college basketball season. James Colliflower coached the team in his second season as head coach. Georgetown was an independent and played its home games at the Arcade Rink, also known as the Arcadia and as the Arcade Auditorium, in Washington, D.C., and finished the season with a record of 11–5.

== Season recap ==
Junior forward and team captain Ronayne "Roy" Waldron led the team in scoring. He played in 15 games and started each of the 15, scored a career-high 163 points, averaging a career-high 10.9 points per game.

== Roster ==
Georgetown players did not wear numbers on their jerseys this season. The first numbered jerseys in Georgetown men's basketball history would not appear until the 1933–34 season.

Senior forward John Martin later served in the U.S. armed forces during World War I, and while in military service died of influenza — the so-called "Spanish flu" — during the 1918–1919 influenza pandemic.

Name	Height	Weight (lbs.)	Position	Class	Hometown	Previous Team(s)
Bill Campbell	N/A	N/A	C	Grad. Stud.	N/A	N/A
Sam Foley	N/A	N/A	G	So.	N/A	N/A
Lemoyne Graham	N/A	N/A	F	Sr.	N/A	N/A
Ed Heiskell	N/A	N/A	G	Jr.	Washington, DC, U.S.	N/A
Bill Hollander	N/A	N/A	C	Jr.	N/A	N/A
Harry "King" Kelly	N/A	N/A	G	Fr.	N/A	N/A
Herbert Lane	N/A	N/A	G	Fr.	N/A	N/A
Bill Martin	5'8"	N/A	F	Sr.	Washington, DC, U.S.	Georgetown Preparatory School (North Bethesda, MD)
John Martin	N/A	N/A	F	Sr.	Washington, DC, U.S.	Georgetown Preparatory School (North Bethesda, MD)
Ed Marum	N/A	N/A	G	Fr.	N/A	N/A
Marvin Ritch	5'8"	N/A	C	So.	Charlotte, NC, U.S.	University of North Carolina
Johnny Shugrue	N/A	N/A	F	So.	Washington, DC, U.S.	Georgetown Preparatory School (North Bethesda, MD)
William Valk	N/A	N/A	G	N/A	Washington, DC, U.S.	Central HS
Ronayne "Roy" Waldron	N/A	N/A	F	Jr.	Greensboro, PA, U.S.	N/A
H. Kelly Wetzell	N/A	N/A	G	Sr.	N/A	N/A
Gene Whalen	N/A	N/A	F	Fr.	N/A	N/A

== 1912–13 schedule and results ==
It was common practice at this time for colleges and universities to include non-collegiate opponents in their schedules, with the games recognized as part of their official record for the season, and the February 12, 1913, game against the Maryland Athletic Club counted as part of Georgetown's won-loss record for 1912–13. It was not until 1952, after the completion of the 1951–52 season, that the National Collegiate Athletic Association (NCAA) ruled that colleges and universities could no longer count games played against non-collegiate opponents in their annual won-loss records.

Trinity College of North Carolina was the future Duke University.

Date time, TV	Opponent	Result	Record	Site city, state
Regular Season
Mon., Dec. 9, 1912 no, no	Catholic	cancelled		Arcade Rink; Washington, DC
Wed., Dec. 11, 1912 no, no	Maryland	W 20–18	1-0	Arcade Rink; Washington, DC
Mon., Dec. 16, 1912 no, no	Washington (Md.)	cancelled		Arcade Rink; Washington, DC
Tue., Jan. 7, 1913 no, no	at Princeton	L 22–34	1-1	N/A; Princeton, NJ
Fri., Jan. 10, 1913 no, no	at Loyola Maryland	L 16–33	1-2	N/A; Baltimore, MD
Sun., Jan. 12, 1913 no, no	at St. John's	W 29–16	2-2	N/A; New York, NY
Mon., Jan. 13, 1913 no, no	at New York University	W 16–4	3-2	N/A; New York, NY
Wed., Jan. 15, 1913 no, no	Oregon State	cancelled		Arcade Rink; Washington, DC
Mon., Jan. 20, 1913 no, no	St. Joseph's	W 44–14	4-2	Arcade Rink; Washington, DC
Fri., Jan. 24, 1913 no, no	at Fordham	cancelled		N/A; New York, NY
Sat., Jan. 25, 1913 no, no	at Yale	cancelled		N/A; New Haven, CT
Wed., Jan. 29, 1913 no, no	VMI	W 26–11	5-2	Arcade Rink; Washington, DC
Fri., Jan. 31, 1913 no, no	Virginia	L 16–22	5-3	Arcade Rink; Washington, DC
Sat., Feb. 1, 1913 no, no	Washington and Lee	cancelled		Arcade Rink; Washington, DC
Mon., Feb. 3, 1913 no, no	Pittsburgh	L 26–32	5-4	Arcade Rink; Washington, DC
Fri., Feb. 7, 1913 no, no	Trinity (N.C.)	W 33–14	6-4	Arcade Rink; Washington, DC
Sat., Feb. 8, 1913 no, no	Alleghany	cancelled		Arcade Rink; Washington, DC
Tue., Feb. 11, 1913 no, no	Fordham	cancelled		Arcade Rink; Washington, DC
Wed., Feb. 12, 1913 no, no	Maryland Athletic Club	W 40–18	7-4	Arcade Rink; Washington, DC
Thu., Feb. 20, 1913 no, no	Franklin & Marshall	W 38–22	8-4	Arcade Rink; Washington, DC
Sat., Feb. 22, 1913 no, no	at Navy	L 18–67	8-5	Dahlgren Hall; Annapolis, MD
Fri., Feb. 28, 1913 no, no	Virginia	W 26–19	9-5	Arcade Rink; Washington, DC
Mon., Mar. 3, 1913 no, no	Princeton	W 23–18	10-5	Arcade Rink; Washington, DC
Tue., Mar. 4, 1913 no, no	Swarthmore	cancelled		Arcade Rink; Washington, DC
Wed., Mar. 5, 1913 no, no	Susquehanna	cancelled		Arcade Rink; Washington, DC
Fri., Mar. 7, 1913 no, no	at Pennsylvania	cancelled		N/A; Philadelphia, PA
Mon., Mar. 10, 1913 no, no	Albright	cancelled		Arcade Rink; Washington, DC
Thu., Mar. 13, 1913 no, no	Bucknell	W 34–23	11-5	Arcade Rink; Washington, DC
*Non-conference game. (#) Tournament seedings in parentheses.
