= Ellery Huntington Sr. =

Biographical details
- Born: June 18, 1865; Medina, Wisconsin, U.S.
- Died: September 18, 1945 (aged 80); Hamilton, New York, U.S.

Coaching career (HC unless noted)

Basketball
- 1900–1913: Colgate

Administrative career (AD unless noted)
- 1900–1935: Colgate

Head coaching record
- Overall: 104–74 (basketball)

Ellery Channing "Doc" Huntington (June 18, 1865 – September 18, 1945) was an American college athletics coach, administrator, and professor. He served as the Director of Physical Education and Athletics at Colgate University from 1900 until his retirement in 1935. Huntington was also the head basketball coach at Colgate from 1900 to 1913, compiling a record of 104–74.

Huntington was born on a farm in Wisconsin. He graduated from Amherst College in 1888 and earned a master's degree from the University of Nashville in 1900. His son, Ellery Huntington Jr., was an All-American quarterback and football coach at Colgate. Huntington died on September 18, 1945, at the age of 80 after suffering a heart attack at his home in Hamilton, New York.
