= 1912–13 Missouri Tigers men's basketball team =

American college basketball season

1912–13 Missouri Tigers men's basketball
- Conference: Big Eight Conference
- Record: 13–5 (9–3 MVIAA)
- Head coach: O.F. Field
- Home arena: Rothwell Gymnasium

The 1912–13 Missouri Tigers men's basketball team represented University of Missouri in the 1912–13 college basketball season. The team was led by second year head coach O.F. Field. The captain of the team was George Edwards.

Missouri finished with a 13–5 record overall and a 9–3 record in the Missouri Valley Intercollegiate Athletic Association. This was good enough for a 2nd-place finish in the regular season conference standings.

== Schedule and results ==
| Date time, TV | Rank^{#} | Opponent^{#} | Result | Record | Site city, state |
|---|---|---|---|---|---|
| January 6* | | Central Methodist | W 39–24 | 1–0 | Columbia, Missouri |
| January 13* | | Central Methodist | W 23–22 | 2–0 | Columbia, Missouri |
| January 16 | | Iowa State | W 28–14 | 3–0 (1–0) | Columbia, Missouri |
| January 17 | | Iowa State | W 25–13 | 4–0 (2–0) | Columbia, Missouri |
| January 21* | | Kansas State | L 18–32 | 4–1 (2–0) | Columbia, Missouri |
| January 22* | | Kansas State | L 27–34 | 4–2 (2–0) | Columbia, Missouri |
| February 5 | | at Washington (MO) | W 29–11 | 5–2 (3–0) | St. Louis, Missouri |
| February 6 | | at Washington (MO) | W 38–13 | 6–2 (4–0) | St. Louis, Missouri |
| February 10 | | at Iowa State | W 33–13 | 7–2 (5–0) | Ames, Iowa |
| February 11 | | at Iowa State | W 24–23 | 8–2 (6–0) | Ames, Iowa |
| February 12* | | at Kansas State | W 25–24 | 9–2 (6–0) | Manhattan, Kansas |
| February 14 | | at Kansas | L 12–22 | 9–3 (6–1) | Lawrence, Kansas |
| February 15 | | at Kansas | L 20–34 | 9–4 (6–2) | Lawrence, Kansas |
| February 17 | | Washington (MO) | W 23–15 | 10–4 (7–2) | Columbia, Missouri |
| February 18 | | Washington (MO) | W 33–31 | 11–4 (8–2) | Columbia, Missouri |
| February 22* | | William Jewell | W 31–20 | 12–4 (8–2) | Columbia, Missouri |
| February 26 | | Kansas | W 26–20 | 13–4 (9–2) | Columbia, Missouri |
| February 27 | | Kansas | L 26–34 | 13–5 (9–3) | Columbia, Missouri |
*Non-conference game. ^{#}Rankings from Coaches' Poll. (#) Tournament seedings in parentheses. All times are in Central Standard Time.
